= Akbarpur =

Akbarpur may refer to:

== Bihar ==
- Akbarpur (community development block), Nawada district
- Akbarpur, Rohtas, a village in Rohtas block in Rohtas district

== Gujarat ==
- Akbarpur, Paliganj, village in Patan district

== Punjab ==
- Akbarpur Khurd, a village under the Shahkot development block of Jalandhar district
- Akbarpur Kalan, a village in Shahkot in the Jalandhar district
- Akbarpur, Bhulath, a village in Bhulath Tehsil in Kapurthala district
- Akbarpur, Kapurthala, a village located in Kapurthala district

== Rajasthan ==
- Akbarpur, a village in Hindaun Block

== Uttar Pradesh ==
- Akbarpur, Ambedkar Nagar, a city and municipal board in Ambedkar Nagar district
  - Akbarpur (Assembly constituency)
  - Akbarpur Airport
  - Akbarpur Junction railway station
- Akbarpur, Kanpur Dehat, a town and municipality in Kanpur Dehat district
  - Akbarpur-Raniya (Vidhan Sabha constituency)
  - Akbarpur (Lok Sabha constituency), a parliamentary constituency in Uttar Pradesh
- Akbarpur, Agra, a village in Agra district
- Akbarpur (meteorite), a meteorite which fell in 1838 in Uttar Pradesh, India
