= Jalbhe =

- Village
- Location in Punjab, India Jalbhe (India)
- Coordinates: 31.470118°N 75.7476102°E
- Country: India
- State: Punjab
- District: Jalandhar

Government
  - Type: Panchayat raj
  - Body: Gram panchayat
- Elevation: 240 m (790 ft)

Languages
  - Official: Punjabi
- Time zone: UTC+5:30 (IST)
- ISO 3166 code: IN-PB
- Website: jalandhar.nic.in

Jalbhe is a village in Jalandhar district of Punjab State, India. It is located 30 kilometres (19 mi) from district headquarter Jalandhar and 155 kilometres (96 mi) from state capital Chandigarh. The village is administrated by a [sarpanch] (Gian Chand) who is an elected representative of village as per Panchayati raj (India).

Kathar, Dhepur and Bahudinpur are located nearby.

== See also ==
- List of villages in India
