= Satowali =

Village in Punjab, India

Sattowali is a village at Jalandhar Pathankot road near Kala Bakra, Jalandhar district, Punjab, India. Sattowali has a chamar majority population with a main village Gurdwara. It is home to NRI from United States, Canada, and the United Kingdom.

Nawan Pind, Nizamudinpur and Dode are located nearby.
