= Kohala =

Kohala may refer to:

- Kohala (mountain) an extinct volcano of Hawaii
- Kohala, Hawaii, two districts on the island of Hawaii
- Kohala, Pakistan, a town in Pakistan
  - Kohala Bridge, a bridge between Azad Kashmir and Pakistan
  - Kohala Hydropower Project Pakistan
- Kohala, Jalandhar a village in Punjab, India
- Kohala, Mysore, a village in Karnataka, India
- Kohala, Estonia, village in Rakvere Parish, Lääne-Viru County, Estonia
- Hans Kohala (born 1966), Swedish athlete

== See also ==
- Koala (disambiguation)
