= Reru =

- Village
- Location in Punjab, India Reru (India)
- Coordinates: 31.3591304°N 75.5863533°E
- Country: India
- State: Punjab
- District: Jalandhar

Government
  - Type: Panchayat raj
  - Body: Gram panchayat
- Elevation: 240 m (790 ft)

Population (2011)
  - Total: 832
- Sex ratio 434/398 ♂/♀

Languages
  - Official: Punjabi
- Time zone: UTC+5:30 (IST)
- ISO 3166 code: IN-PB
- Website: jalandhar.nic.in

Reru is a village in Jalandhar district of Punjab State, India. It is located 52 kilometres (32 mi) from Shahkot, 35 kilometres (22 mi) from Nakodar, 5 kilometres (3.1 mi) from district headquarter Jalandhar and 152 kilometres (94 mi) from state capital Chandigarh. The village is administrated by a sarpanch who is an elected representative of village as per Panchayati raj (India).

== Transport ==
Jalandhar City station is the nearest train station. The village is 23 kilometres (14 mi) away from domestic airport in Adampur and the nearest international airport is located in Chandigarh also Sri Guru Ram Dass Jee International Airport is the second nearest airport which is 92 kilometres (57 mi) away in Amritsar.
