= Boparai =

Boparai may refer to:

- Boparai, Kapurthala, a villages in the Indian state of Punjab
- Boparai Khurd, a village in the Indian state of Punjab
- Boparai Kalan, Ludhiana, a village in the Indian state of Punjab
- BupaRa Khurd (بوپارا خورد)، Nowshera Virkan, A village in Punjab Pakistan
- BoopaRa Kalan (بوپاراے کلاں)، Nowshera Virkan, A village in Punjab Pakistan

== See also ==
- Ravi Bopara, British-Indian cricketer
