= Bullowal =

- Village
- Interactive map of Bullowal
- Coordinates: 31°31′42.93″N 75°33′40.70″E
- Country: India
- State: Punjab
- District: Jalandhar
- Tehsil: Bhogpur
- Region: Doaba

Government
  - Type: Panchayat raj
  - Body: Gram panchayat

Population (2011)
  - Total: 1,088
  - Total Households: 208
- Sex ratio 585/503 ♂/♀

Languages
  - Official: Punjabi
- Time zone: UTC+5:30 (IST)
- Telephone: 01871
- ISO 3166 code: IN-PB
- Vehicle registration: PB-08

Bullowal is a village in Bhogpur in Jalandhar district of Punjab State, India. The village is administrated by Sarpanch an elected representative of the village.

== Demography ==
As of 2011, the village has a total number of 208 houses and a population of 1088 of which 585 are males while 503 are females according to the report published by Census India in 2011. The literacy rate of the village is 72.61%, lower than the state average of 75.84%. The population of children under the age of six years is 124 which is 11.40% of total population of the village, and child sex ratio is approximately 676 lower than the state average of 846.

== See also ==
- List of villages in India
