= Akhara, Bhogpur =

Akhara
- village
- Location in Punjab, India Akhara (India)
- Coordinates: 31.540950°N 75.541173°E
- Country: India
- State: Punjab
- District: Jalandhar

Languages
  - Official: Punjabi
- Time zone: UTC+5:30 (IST)
- PIN: 144622
- Vehicle registration: PB- 08

Akhara or Akhada village comes under the Bhogpur development block of Jalandhar. Jalandhar is a district in the Indian state of Punjab.

== About ==
Akhara lies on the Bhogpur-Bholath road. The nearest railway station to Akhara is Bhogpur Railway station, 14 km away. According to 2011 census, the population of the village is 1235. about 51% of the population is male and rest is female population. it lies on the periphery of the Jalandhar district. The sports club of Akhara i.e. sports and welfare club, Akhara. The club organizes a Volleyball tournament every year to raise awareness about sports and decrease the influence of drugs.

== Post code ==
Akhara's post office is Boparai whose PIN is 144622.
