= Tarkhan Mazara =

- Village
- Location in Punjab, India Tarkhan Mazara (India)
- Coordinates: 31.0847121°N 75.8149712°E
- Country: India
- State: Punjab
- District: Jalandhar
- Tehsil: Phillaur

Government
  - Type: Panchayat raj
  - Body: Gram panchayat
- Elevation: 246 m (807 ft)

Population (2011)
  - Total: 630
- Sex ratio 303/327 ♂/♀

Languages
  - Official: Punjabi
- Time zone: UTC+5:30 (IST)
- PIN: 144418
- Telephone code: 01826
- ISO 3166 code: IN-PB
- Vehicle registration: PB 37
- Post Office: Atti
- Website: jalandhar.nic.in

Tarkhan Mazara or Tarkhan Majara is a medium size village in Phillaur tehsil of Jalandhar District of Punjab State, India. It is located 1 km away from postal head office Atti, 5.6 km from Phillaur, 41.9 km from district headquarter Jalandhar and 128 km from state capital Chandigarh. The village is administrated by a sarpanch who is an elected representative of village as per Panchayati raj (India).

== Demography ==
As of 2011, Tarkhan Mazara has a total number of 123 houses and a population of 630 of which 303 include are males while 327 are females according to the report published by Census India in 2011. The literacy rate of Tarkhan Mazara is 83.20%, higher than state average of 88.16%. The population of children under the age of 6 years is 64 which is 10.16% of total population of Tarkhan Mazara, and child sex ratio is approximately 939 as compared to Punjab state average of 846.

Most of the people are from Schedule Caste which constitutes 56.3% of total population in Tarkhan Mazara. The town does not have any Schedule Tribe population so far.

162 people were engaged in work activities out of the total population of Tarkhan Mazara which includes 147 males and 15 females. According to census survey report 2011, 95.68% of workers describe their work as main work and 4.32% workers are involved in marginal activity providing livelihood for less than 6 months. Of the 162 in the working population, 94% workers are occupied in main work, 5.6% are cultivators while 0.62% are Agricultural labourer.

== Transport ==
=== Rail ===
Phillaur Junction is the nearest train station however, Bhattian Railway Station is 5.1 km away from the village.

=== Air ===
The nearest domestic airport is located 43.4 km away in Ludhiana and the nearest international airport is located in Chandigarh also Sri Guru Ram Dass Jee International Airport is the second nearest airport which is 136 km away in Amritsar.
