= Alamgir, Bhogpur =

Coordinates: 30°48′N 75°52′E

Alamgir
- Village
- Interactive map of Alamgir
- Country: India
- State: Punjab
- District: Jalandhar

Languages
  - Official: Punjabi
- Time zone: UTC+5:30 (IST)
- PIN: 144303
- Telephone code: 0181
- Vehicle registration: PB- 08

Alamgir village comes under the Bhogpur development block of Jalandhar. Jalandhar is a district in the Indian state of Punjab.

== About ==
Alamgir lies on the Jalandhar-Pathankot road. The nearest railway station to Alamgir is Kala Bakra station at 2 km from it.
