= Bamuwal =

- Village
- Location in Punjab, India Bamuwal (India)
- Coordinates: 31.502912°N 75.436658°E
- Country: India
- State: Punjab
- District: Kapurthala

Government
  - Type: Panchayati raj (India)
  - Body: Gram panchayat

Population (2011)
  - Total: 2,054
- Sex ratio 1,099/955♂/♀

Languages
  - Official: Punjabi
  - Other spoken: Hindi
- Time zone: UTC+5:30 (IST)
- PIN: 144802
- Telephone code: 01822
- ISO 3166 code: IN-PB
- Vehicle registration: PB-09
- Website: kapurthala.gov.in

Bamuwal is a village in Kapurthala district of Punjab State, India. It is located 15 kilometres (9.3 mi) from Kapurthala, which is both district and sub-district headquarters of Bamuwal. The village is administrated by a Sarpanch, who is an elected representative.

== Demography ==
According to the report published by Census India in 2011, Bamuwal has a total number of 397 houses and population of 2,054 of which include 1,099 males and 955 females. Literacy rate of Bamuwal is 71.66%, lower than state average of 75.84%. The population of children under the age of 6 years is 233 which is 11.34% of total population of Bamuwal, and child sex ratio is approximately 713 lower than state average of 846.

== Population data ==
Particulars	Total	Male	Female
Total No. of Houses	397	-	-
Population	2,054	1,099	955
Child (0-6)	233	136	97
Schedule Caste	935	509	426
Schedule Tribe	0	0	0
Literacy	71.66 %	72.69 %	70.51 %
Total Workers	729	610	119
Main Worker	459	0	0
Marginal Worker	270	206	64

== Air travel connectivity ==
The closest airports to the village are Sri Guru Ram Dass Jee International Airport, Amritsar and Shri Guru Ravidass Maharaj Ji Airport, Adampur.
