= Kathar =

Kathar may refer to:

- Katha, Myanmar, a town in Myanmar
- Kathar, Nepal, a village in Nepal
- Kathar, Punjab, a village in India

== See also ==
- Cathar
- Katha
