= Kot Kalan =

- Village
- Location in Punjab, India Kot Kalan (India)
- Coordinates: 31.273677°N 75.6644564°E
- Country: India
- State: Punjab
- District: Jalandhar

Government
  - Type: Panchayat raj
  - Body: Gram panchayat
- Elevation: 240 m (790 ft)

Languages
  - Official: Punjabi
- Time zone: UTC+5:30 (IST)
- ISO 3166 code: IN-PB
- Website: jalandhar.nic.in

Kot Kalan is a village in Jalandhar district of Punjab State, India. It is located 11 kilometres (6.8 mi) from district headquarter Jalandhar and 140 kilometres (87 mi) from state capital Chandigarh. The village is administrated by a sarpanch who is an elected representative of village as per Panchayati raj (India).

== See also ==
- Kot Khurd
- List of villages in India
