= Angi Kiri =

AngaKiri
- village
- Location in Punjab, India AngaKiri (India)
- Coordinates: 31.042948°N 75.468475°E
- Country: India
- State: Punjab
- District: Jalandhar

Languages
  - Official: Punjabi
  - Regional: Punjabi
- Time zone: UTC+5:30 (IST)
- PIN: 144041
- Telephone code: 01821
- Vehicle registration: PB- 08
- Nearest city: Mehatpurl

Anga Kiri is a small village in Nakodar. Nakodar is a tehsil in the city Jalandhar of Indian state of Punjab.

== About ==
Angi Kiri lies on the Mehatpur road. It is almost 1 km from Mehatpur bus stand. The nearest main road to Angi Kiri is Nakodar-Mehatpur road. The nearest Railway station to this village is Nakodar Railway station.

== STD code ==
Angi Kiri's STD code is 01821.
