= Koala (disambiguation) =

The koala is an Australian marsupial mammal species.

Koala or KOALA may also refer to:

== Aircraft ==
- AgustaWestland AW119 Koala, an Italian helicopter model
- Fisher FP-202 Koala, a Canadian one-seat kit plane
- Fisher Super Koala, a Canadian two-seat kit plane
- Pottier P.220S Koala, a French two-seat kit plane

== Arts and entertainment ==
- The Koala, an American satirical college newspaper
- "Koala" (song), 2014, by Oliver Heldens
- El Koala (born 1970), Spanish musician
- Kid Koala (born 1974), Canadian DJ and producer
- Kids Own Australian Literature Awards
- Koala, a character in the Hunter × Hunter manga series

== Military ==
- Kh-90, a Soviet/Russian cruise missile (NATO: AS-X-19 Koala)
- HMAS Koala, an Australian naval auxiliary ship in WWII

== Places ==
- Koala kingdom, West Africa
- Koala Island, Antarctica

== Other uses ==
- Two astronomical explosions:
  - Koala (transient)
  - The Koala (transient)
- Marthe Koala (born 1994), Burkinabè hurdler and heptathlete
- Koala, a 1962 Australian racecar

== See also ==
- Kohala (disambiguation)
- Coala, a 1995 video game
- Kuala, Indonesia
