= Aliwal =

Aliwal may refer to:

- Aliwal, Taran Taran, a village in the Indian state of Punjab
- Aliwal, Jalandhar, a village in the Indian state of Punjab
- Battle of Aliwal fought in 1846 between the British and the Sikhs
- Maletswai, formerly known as Aliwal North, a town in central South Africa
- Aliwal South, another name for the Mossel Bay area of South Africa
