= Ali Khel, Jalandhar =

Ali Khel
- Village
- Location in Punjab, India
- Coordinates: 31.4721401°N 75.516939°E
- Country: India
- State: Punjab
- District: Jalandhar

Languages
  - Official: Punjabi
- Time zone: UTC+5:30 (IST)
- Vehicle registration: PB- 08

Ali Khel is a village in Jalandhar. Jalandhar is a district in the Indian state of Punjab.

== About ==
Ali Khel lies on the Kartarpur-Bhogpur road. The nearest railway station to Ali Khel is Kartarpur railway station at a distance of 3 km.

== Post code ==
Ali Khel's post office is Kartarpur whose post code is 144801.
