= Alampur, Jalandhar =

Alampur
- Village
- Interactive map of Alampur
- Coordinates: 31°29′53.01″N 75°31′25.10″E
- Country: India
- State: Punjab
- District: Jalandhar

Languages
  - Official: Punjabi
- Time zone: UTC+5:30 (IST)

Alampur Bhakha or commonly known as Alampur is a village in Jalandhar. Jalandhar is a district of Indian state Punjab.

== About ==
Alampur lies on the Kartarpur-Bhogpur road. The nearest railway station to Alampur is Kartarpur railway station at a distance of 8 km.

== Post code ==
Alampur's Post code is 144622.
