= Jaid =

- Village
- Location in Punjab, India Jaid (India)
- Coordinates: 31.597271°N 75.582978°E
- Country: India
- State: Punjab
- District: Kapurthala
- Tehsil: Bhulath

Government
  - Type: Panchayati raj (India)
  - Body: Gram panchayat
- Elevation: 233 m (764 ft)

Population (2011)
  - Total: 1,725

Languages
  - Official: Punjabi
  - Other spoken: Hindi
- Time zone: UTC+5:30 (IST)
- PIN: 144636
- Telephone code: 01822
- ISO 3166 code: IN-PB
- Vehicle registration: PB-09
- Website: kapurthala.gov.in

Jaid is a village in Bhulath Tehsil in Kapurthala district of Punjab State, India. It is located 8 kilometres (5.0 mi) from Bhulath, 28 kilometres (17 mi) away from district headquarter Kapurthala. The village is administrated by a Sarpanch who is an elected representative of village as per the constitution of India and Panchayati raj (India).

== Demographics ==
According to the 2011 census, the village ofJaid comprises 341households with a total population of 1,725. Of this, 908 are males, making up 52.6% of the population, while 817 are females, accounting for 47.4%.

Population Data based on the 2011 census
Population	Census Data	% of Total population
Total population - Person	1725	
Total population - Males	908	52.6%
Total population - Females	817	47.4%

== List of nearby cities ==
The village of Jaid is located in proximity to several cities, that serve as hubs for commerce, education, healthcare, and transportation.

- Bhulath
- Kapurthala
- Phagwara
- Sultanpur Lodhi
- Bhogpur

These cities play an important role in the socio-economic life of Jaid's residents, offering access to modern facilities and fostering connectivity with the broader region.

== Air travel connectivity ==
The nearest airport to Jaid is Sri Guru Ram Dass Jee International Airport in Amritsar, providing both domestic and international flight connectivity.
