= Sitalpur =

Sitalpur may refer to:

- Sitalpur, Chittagong, neighbourhood in Chittagong, Bangladesh
- Sitalpur, Jalandhar, Punjab, village in Punjab, India
- Sitalpur railway station, railway station in West Bengal, India
