= Aemakazi =

- Village
- Country: India
- State: Punjab
- District: Jalandhar

Languages
  - Official: Punjabi
- Time zone: UTC+5:30 (IST)
- PIN: 144801

Aemakazi is a village in Jalandhar. Jalandhar is a district in the Indian state of Punjab.

== About ==
Aemakazi lies on the Kartarpur-Kala Bakra road. The nearest railway station to Aemakazi is Kala Bakra railway station at a distance of 8 km.

== Post code ==
Aemakazi's post office is Mustafapur whose post code is 144801.
