= Gignowal =

Gignowal (also known as Giganwal) is a village situated in the Hoshiarpur District of Punjab in Northern India.

Gignowal is bordered by the following villages: Pandori Khajoor, Sekhupur, Pandori Bhawa, Nangal Maroof, Bahad, Dhade Fateh Singh, Dosarka and Fatehpur. The village is spread over a one-square-kilometre (0.4 sq mi) area, although it has started to expand beyond its boundaries. Residents own agricultural land in other villages.

Gignowal contains the Sri Guru Singh Sabha gurudwara and the Bhagat Ravidas ji gurudwara. The Hoshirapur Tanda Urmur road passes 200 yards away from the village where there is a bus stop. There is a government middle school near the entrance to the village. The nearest railway station is at Hoshiarpur, roughly 12 km away. The nearest airport is Adampur Airport at a distance of 36 km.
