= Adagil =

- Village
- Interactive map of Adagil
- Coordinates: 31°18′53.73″N 75°26′13.10″E
- Country: India
- State: Punjab
- District: Jalandhar

Languages
  - Official: Punjabi
- Time zone: UTC+5:30 (IST)
- PIN: 144002
- Vehicle registration: PB- 08

Adagil is a village located in Jalandhar. Jalandhar is a district in the Indian state of Punjab.

== About ==
Adagil lies on the Jalandhar-Kapurthala road. The nearest railway station to Adagil is Jalandhar Railway station at 14 km from it.

== Post code ==
Adagil's post office is Athola, with a PIN code of 144002.
