= Alewali =

Coordinates: 31°07′N 75°24′E

- Village
- Interactive map of Alewali
- Country: India
- State: Punjab
- District: Jalandhar

Languages
  - Official: Punjabi
- Time zone: UTC+5:30 (IST)
- PIN: 144040

Alewali is a village in Nakodar tehsil, Jalandhar district, of Indian state of Punjab.

== About ==
Alewali lies on the Nakodar-Shahkot road which lies at a distance of 3 km from it. The nearest railway station to Alewali is Gadran railway station at a distance of 1 km.

== Post code ==
Alewali's Post office is Bara Sidhpur whose post code is 144040.
