= Adraman =

Adramann
- Village
- Interactive map of Adramann
- Coordinates: 31°01′48.23″N 75°15′23.22″E
- Country: India
- State: Punjab
- District: Jalandhar

Languages
  - Official: Punjabi
- Time zone: UTC+5:30 (IST)
- Vehicle registration: PB- 08

Adramann is a village in Nakodar. Nakodar is a city in the district Jalandhar of Indian state of Punjab.

Adramann lies on the Nakodar-Mehatpur road which is almost 3 km from it. The nearest railway station to Adramann is Nakodar railway station at a distance of 12 km.
