= Ali Chak =

- Village
- Location in Punjab, India Ali Chak (India)
- Coordinates: 31.292495°N 75.48299°E
- Country: India
- State: Punjab
- District: Jalandhar

Languages
  - Official: Punjabi
- Time zone: UTC+5:30 (IST)
- PIN: 144002
- Vehicle registration: PB- 08

Ali Chak is a village in Jalandhar. Jalandhar is a district of Indian state of Punjab. Ali Chak is in India dist Jalandhar, karputhala.

== Post code ==
Ali Chak's Post office is Kohala whose post code is 144002.
