= Behram Sarishta =

- village
- Location in Punjab, India Behram Sarishta (India)
- Coordinates: 31.56°N 75.62°E
- Country: India
- State: Punjab
- District: Jalandhar

Government
  - Body: Jalandhar

Languages
  - Official: Punjabi
- Time zone: UTC+5:30 (IST)
- PIN: 144201
- Telephone code: 0181272****
- Vehicle registration: PB-
- Nearest city: Hoshiarpur
- Lok Sabha constituency: Jalandhar
- Civic agency: Jalandhar

Behram Sarishta is a village in Jalandhar district of Punjab, India. It is located at 31.56°N 75.62°E. It has an average elevation of 232 to 237 metres (761 to 791 feet).

It is an old village known for its big market where the businessmen in old times used to transact. It is known for having a Haveli, built by Nwabs, which is still there but in a poor condition. Behram was the name of a nawab who ruled in this small area. From his name the village got its name and meaning of Sarishta is- 'town'. Before the building of National Highway 1B through the nearby town of Bhogpur sirwal, the village was centre for all governmental and non-governmental activities.

This is the last village of Jalandhar district on Bhogpur–Hoshiarpur road adjoining the boundary of Hoshiarpur district. A famous saint, Baba Jamna Das Ji, was a resident of this village. He died in 1932. Every year a feast is organised in his remembrance on 9th of 'bhaadron' (25 August). Behram Sarishta is a unique village, which consist of people from all castes. There are 2 Gurudwara, 1 Ravidas Temple, 1 Balmik Temple, 1 Hindu Temple, 1 Shiv Temple, 4 churches and several Muslim Dargahs.
