= Isharwal, Jalandhar =

Isharwal
- village
- Location in Punjab, India Isharwal (India)
- Coordinates: 31°21′9.74″N 75°43′34.38″E
- Country: India
- State: Punjab
- District: Jalandhar

Population (2011)
  - Total: 1,227

Languages
  - Official: Punjabi
  - Regional: Punjabi
- Time zone: UTC+5:30 (IST)

Isharwal is a village located in the Jalandhar district of Punjab, India. The total population of the village is about 1,227.

== See also ==
- Chak Isharwal
