= Awan Khalsa =

- Village
- Location in Punjab, India Awan Khalsa (India)
- Coordinates: 31.003446689807163°N 75.54406775755422°E
- Country: India
- State: Punjab
- District: Jalandhar
- Tehsil: Nakodar

Government
  - Type: Panchayat raj
  - Body: Gram panchayat

Area
  - Total: 282 ha (700 acres)

Population (2011)
  - Total: 674
  - Density: 239/km^{2} (619/sq mi)
  - Scheduled Castes: 240; 125/115 ♂/♀
  - Total Households: 125
- Sex ratio 354/320 ♂/♀

Languages
  - Official: Punjabi
- Time zone: UTC+5:30 (IST)
- PIN: 144039
- ISO 3166 code: IN-PB
- Vehicle registration: PB- 08
- Website: jalandhar.gov.in

Awan Khalsa is a village in the Nakodar tehsil, Jalandhar district, in the state of Punjab, India. According to the 2011 census, it has a population of 674, and a literacy rate of 80.3%.

There is primary and middle schooling in the village, but for secondary schooling its residents rely on a school in Baghela, which is less than 5 kilometres (3 mi) away.
