= Lesariwala =

- Village
- Location in Punjab, India Lesariwala (India)
- Coordinates: 31°24′49″N 75°40′13″E
- Country: India
- State: Punjab
- District: Jalandhar
- Tehsil: Jalandhar - I

Government
  - Type: Panchayat raj
  - Body: Gram panchayat

Area
  - Total: 389 ha (960 acres)

Population (2011)
  - Total: 2,217; 1,165/1,052 ♂/♀
  - Scheduled Castes: 1,882; 995/887 ♂/♀
  - Total Households: 468

Languages
  - Official: Punjabi
- Time zone: UTC+5:30 (IST)
- Telephone: 144102
- ISO 3166 code: IN-PB
- Vehicle registration: PB-08
- Post office: Chuharwali B.O
- Website: jalandhar.gov.in

Lesariwala is a village in Jalandhar - I in Jalandhar district of Punjab State, India. It is located 17 kilometres (11 mi) from district headquarter. The village is administrated by Sarpanch an elected representative of the village.

== Demography ==
As of 2011, the village has a total number of 468 houses and a population of 2217 of which 1165 are males while 1052 are females. According to the report published by Census India in 2011, out of the total population of the village 1882 people are from Schedule Caste and the village does not have any Schedule Tribe population so far.

== See also ==
- List of villages in India
