= Sundar Tatar =

- Village
- Location in Punjab, India Sundar Tatar (India)
- Coordinates: 31.0962437°N 75.6271079°E
- Country: India
- State: Punjab
- District: Jalandhar

Government
  - Type: Panchayat raj
  - Body: Gram panchayat
- Elevation: 240 m (790 ft)

Population (2011)
  - Total: 146
- Sex ratio 76/64 ♂/♀

Languages
  - Official: Punjabi
- Time zone: UTC+5:30 (IST)
- PIN: 144031
- ISO 3166 code: IN-PB
- Vehicle registration: PB- 08
- Website: jalandhar.nic.in

Sundar Tatar is a village in Jalandhar district of Punjab State, India. It is located 10.9 km (7 miles) from Nurmahal, 19.6 km from Phillaur, 34 km (21 mi) from district headquarter Jalandhar and 140 km (87 mi) from state capital Chandigarh. The village is administrated by Sarpanch, as an elected representative of the village.

== Transport ==
Nurmahal railway station is the nearest train station. However, Phillaur Junction train station is 19 kilometres (12 mi) away from the village. The village is 48 km (30 mi) from the domestic airport in Ludhiana, and the nearest international airport is located in Chandigarh. Also Sri Guru Ram Dass Jee International Airport is the second-nearest airport, which is 128 km (80 mi) away in Amritsar.
