= Alipur-2 =

- Village
- Location in Punjab, India Alipur-2 (India)
- Coordinates: 31.271527°N 75.652375°E
- Country: India
- State: Punjab
- District: Jalandhar

Languages
  - Official: Punjabi
- Time zone: UTC+5:30 (IST)
- PIN
- Vehicle registration: PB- 08

Alipur-2 village comes under the Jalandhar East development block of Jalandhar. Jalandhar is a district in the Indian state of Punjab.

== About ==
Alipur-2 lies on the Jalandhar-Phagwara road. The nearest railway station to Alipur-2 is Chaheru Railway station at 6 km from it.
