= Boparai, Kapurthala =

Boparai
- Village
- Location in Punjab, India Boparai (India)
- Coordinates: 31.5449°N 75.5563°E
- Country: India
- State: Punjab
- District: Kapurthala

Languages
  - Official: Punjabi
- Time zone: UTC+5:30 (IST)
- PIN: 144622
- Telephone code: 01822
- Vehicle registration: PB-09

Boparai village comes under the Nadala development block of Kapurthala. Kapurthala is a district in the Indian state of Punjab.

== About ==
Boparai lies on the Bholath-Bhogpur Road.

It is located near Bholath and it is about 16 km from Kartarpur and about 32 km from Jalandhar.

There are two Gurudwara Sahib:

1. Gurudwara Shri Guru Hargobind Sahib Ji, an historical gurudwara;
2. Gurudwara Baba Handal Ji;

== Post code ==
Boparai's postal code is 144622.
