= Koala Island =

Island in Antarctica

- Location within Antarctica

Geography
- Location: Antarctica
- Coordinates: 67°34′S 47°53′E

Administration
- Administered under the Antarctic Treaty System

Demographics
- Population: Uninhabited

Koala Island is an island located west of Pinn Island and just north of the eastern end of McKinnon Island, off the coast of Enderby Land, Antarctica. It was plotted from air photos taken from Australian National Antarctic Research Expeditions aircraft in 1956. The island was named by the Antarctic Names Committee of Australia after the koala, an Australian marsupial.

== See also ==
- List of Antarctic and sub-Antarctic islands
