= Bara Sidhpur =

- Village
- Location in Punjab, India Bara Sidhpur (India)
- Coordinates: 31.1184453°N 75.4007792°E
- Country: India
- State: Punjab
- District: Jalandhar
- Tehsil: Nakodar

Government
  - Type: Panchayat raj
  - Body: Gram panchayat
- Elevation: 240 m (790 ft)

Population (2011)
  - Total: 399
- Sex ratio 205/194 ♂/♀

Languages
  - Official: Punjabi
- Time zone: UTC+5:30 (IST)
- PIN: 144040
- ISO 3166 code: IN-PB
- Vehicle registration: PB- 08
- Website: jalandhar.nic.in

Bara Sidhpur ਬਾੜਾ ਸਿੱਧਪੁਰ is a village in Nakodar in Jalandhar district of Punjab State, India. It is located 8.6 km from Nakodar, 41.2 km from Kapurthala, 32 km from district headquarter Jalandhar and 153 km from state capital Chandigarh. The village is administrated by a sarpanch who is an elected representative of village as per Panchayati raj (India).

== Transport ==
Nakodar railway station is the nearest train station; however, Phagwara Junction train station is 41.4 km away from the village. The village is 71 km away from domestic airport in Ludhiana and the nearest international airport is located in Chandigarh also Sri Guru Ram Dass Jee International Airport is the second nearest airport which is 109 km away in Amritsar.
