= Alipur-1 =

- Village
- Location in Punjab, India
- Coordinates: 31.269817°N 75.575367°E
- Country: India
- State: Punjab
- District: Jalandhar

Languages
  - Official: Punjabi
- Time zone: UTC+5:30 (IST)
- PIN
- Vehicle registration: PB- 08

Alipur-1 village comes under the Jalandhar East development block of Jalandhar. Jalandhar is a district in the Indian state of Punjab.

== About ==
Alipur-1 lies on the Jalandhar-Nakodar road. Jamsher is the closest railway station, 4 km away. It falls under Jalandhar Cantt constituency.
