= Chak Isharwal =

- Village
- Location in Punjab, India Chak Isharwal (India)
- Coordinates: 31.3637697°N 75.7215152°E
- Country: India
- State: Punjab
- District: Jalandhar

Government
  - Type: Panchayat raj
  - Body: Gram panchayat
- Elevation: 240 m (790 ft)

Languages
  - Official: Punjabi
- Time zone: UTC+5:30 (IST)
- ISO 3166 code: IN-PB
- Website: jalandhar.nic.in

Chak Isharwal is a village in Jalandhar district of Punjab State, India. It is located 24 kilometres (15 mi) from Jalandhar and 143 kilometres (89 mi) from state capital Chandigarh. The village is administrated by a sarpanch who is an elected representative of village as per Panchayati raj (India).

== See also ==
- List of villages in India
