= Sitalpur, Jalandhar =

Sitalpur
- Village
- Location in Punjab, India Sitalpur (India)
- Coordinates: 31.4727358°N 75.6133326°E
- Country: India
- State: Punjab
- District: Jalandhar
- Tehsil: Jalandhar - I

Government
  - Type: Panchayat raj
  - Body: Gram panchayat

Area
  - Total: 150.4 ha (372 acres)

Population (2011)
  - Total: 643; 315/328 ♂/♀
  - Scheduled Castes: 291; 141/150 ♂/♀
  - Total Households: 141

Languages
  - Official: Punjabi
- Time zone: UTC+5:30 (IST)
- PIN: 144303
- ISO 3166 code: IN-PB
- Vehicle registration: PB-08
- Post office: Kala Bakra S.O
- Website: jalandhar.gov.in

Sitalpur is a village in Jalandhar - I in Jalandhar district of Punjab State, India. It is located 17 kilometres (11 mi) from district headquarter. The village is administrated by Sarpanch an elected representative of the village.

== Demography ==
As of 2011, the village had a total number of 141 houses and a population of 643 of which 315 are males while 328 are females.

According to the report published by Census India in 2011, out of the total population of the village 291 people are from Schedule Caste and the village does not have any Schedule Tribe population so far.

== See also ==
- List of villages in India
