= Kohala, Jalandhar =

Coordinates: 31°00′N 74°50′E

Kohala
- Village
- Interactive map of Kohala
- Country: India
- State: Punjab
- District: Jalandhar

Languages
  - Official: Punjabi
- Time zone: UTC+5:30 (IST)
- Vehicle registration: PB- 08

Kohala is a village in Jalandhar. Jalandhar is a district in the Indian state of Punjab.

== About ==
Kohala lies on the Jalandhar-Kapurthala road at a distance of 4 km from it. The nearest railway station to Kohala is Khojewal railway station at a distance of 6 km.

== Post code ==
Kohala's post code is 144002.
