= Jago Sangha =

- Village
- Location in Punjab, India Jago Sangha (India)
- Coordinates: 31.1096089°N 75.6020522°E
- Country: India
- State: Punjab
- District: Jalandhar

Government
  - Type: Panchayat raj
  - Body: Gram panchayat
- Elevation: 240 m (790 ft)

Population (2011)
  - Total: 285
- Sex ratio 149/136 ♂/♀

Languages
  - Official: Punjabi
- Time zone: UTC+5:30 (IST)
- PIN: 144039
- Telephone: 01821
- ISO 3166 code: IN-PB
- Vehicle registration: PB- 08
- Post Office: Nurmahal
- Website: jalandhar.nic.in

Jago Sangha is a village in Jalandhar district of Punjab State, India. It is located 3 km away from postal head office Nurmahal, 14.8 km from Phillaur, 28.2 km from district headquarter Jalandhar and 145 km from state capital Chandigarh. The village is administrated by a sarpanch who is an elected representative of village as per Panchayati raj (India).

== Education ==
The village has a Punjabi medium, co-ed primary school (PRI Jago Sangha). The school provide mid-day meal as per Indian Midday Meal Scheme and the meal prepared in school premises and it was found in 1976.

== Demography ==
According to the report published by Census India in 2011, Jago Sangha has a total number of 62 houses and population of 285 of which include 149 males and 136 females. Literacy rate of Jago Sangha is 72.76%, lower than state average of 75.84%. The population of children under the age of 6 years is 28 which is 9.82% of total population of Jago Sangha, and child sex ratio is approximately 1545 higher than state average of 846.

Most of the people are from Schedule Caste which constitutes 13.33% of total population in Jago Sangha. The town does not have any Schedule Tribe population so far.

As per census 2011, 103 people were engaged in work activities out of the total population of Jago Sangha which includes 98 males and 5 females. According to census survey report 2011, 94.17% workers describe their work as main work and 5.83% workers are involved in marginal activity providing livelihood for less than 6 months.

== Transport ==
Nurmahal railway station is the nearest train station; however, Nakodar train station is 22.6 km away from the village. The village is 52.9 km away from domestic airport in Ludhiana and the nearest international airport is located in Chandigarh also Sri Guru Ram Dass Jee International Airport is the second nearest airport which is 124 km away in Amritsar.
