= Nawan Pind =

- Village
- Location in Punjab, India Nawan Pind (India)
- Coordinates: 31.462549°N 75.6057726°E
- Country: India
- State: Punjab
- District: Jalandhar
- Tehsil: Jalandhar - I

Government
  - Type: Panchayat raj
  - Body: Gram panchayat

Area
  - Total: 54 ha (130 acres)

Population (2011)
  - Total: 34; 17/17 ♂/♀
  - Scheduled Castes: 4; 3/1 ♂/♀
  - Total Households: 9

Languages
  - Official: Punjabi
- Time zone: UTC+5:30 (IST)
- PIN: 144004
- ISO 3166 code: IN-PB
- Vehicle registration: PB-08
- Post office: Industrial Town S.O
- Website: jalandhar.gov.in

Nawan Pind is a village in Jalandhar - I in Jalandhar district of Punjab State, India. It is located 16 kilometres (9.9 mi) from district headquarter. The village is administrated by Sarpanch an elected representative of the village.

== Demography ==
As of 2011, the village has a total number of nine houses and a population of 34 of which 17 are males while 17 are females. According to the report published by Census India in 2011, out of the total population of the village, four people are from Schedule Caste and the village does not have any Schedule Tribe population so far.

== See also ==
- List of villages in India
