= Aulakh, Nakodar =

Aulakh
- Village
- Location in Punjab, India Aulakh (India)
- Coordinates: 31.0962517°N 75.4843246°E
- Country: India
- State: Punjab
- District: Jalandhar
- Tehsil: Nakodar

Government
  - Type: Panchayat raj
  - Body: Gram panchayat
- Elevation: 232 m (761 ft)

Population (2011)
  - Total: 955
- Sex ratio 486/469 ♂/♀

Languages
  - Official: Punjabi
- Time zone: UTC+5:30 (IST)
- PIN: 144040
- Telephone: 01821
- ISO 3166 code: IN-PB
- Vehicle registration: PB- 08
- Post office: Nakoder
- Website: jalandhar.nic.in

Aulakh is a village in Nakodar in Jalandhar district of Punjab State, India. It is located 4.8 km from Nakodar, 41.3 km from Kapurthala, 28.8 km from district headquarter Jalandhar and 145 km from state capital Chandigarh. The village is administrated by a sarpanch who is an elected representative of village as per Panchayati raj (India).

== Transport ==
Nakodar railway station is the nearest train station; however, Phillaur Junction train station is 33 km away from the village. The village is 62 km away from domestic airport in Ludhiana and the nearest international airport is located in Chandigarh also Sri Guru Ram Dass Jee International Airport is the second nearest airport which is 118 km away in Amritsar.
