= Chhatowali =

Sattowali
- Village
- Location in Punjab, India Sattowali (India)
- Coordinates: 31.4103659°N 75.7037302°E
- Country: India
- State: Punjab
- District: Jalandhar

Government
  - Type: Panchayat raj
  - Body: Gram panchayat
- Elevation: 240 m (790 ft)

Languages
  - Official: Punjabi
- Time zone: UTC+5:30 (IST)
- ISO 3166 code: IN-PB
- Website: jalandhar.nic.in

Sattowali is a village in Jalandhar district of Punjab State, India. It is located 24 kilometres (15 mi) from district headquarter Jalandhar and 150 kilometres (93 mi) from state capital Chandigarh. The village is administrated by a sarpanch who is an elected representative of village as per Panchayati raj (India). Maximum community of the village are from chammar caste. Theses one Angarwari School and one Primary School up to class 5th in the village. Other Private schools Imperial School and Rainbow Public School are at distance of less than one KM only.

== See also ==
- List of villages in India
