= Ashahoor =

- Village
- Location in Punjab, India Ashahoor (India)
- Coordinates: 31.0255583°N 75.8581656°E
- Country: India
- State: Punjab
- District: Jalandhar
- Tehsil: Phillaur

Government
  - Type: Panchayat raj
  - Body: Gram panchayat
- Elevation: 246 m (807 ft)

Languages
  - Official: Punjabi
- Time zone: UTC+5:30 (IST)
- PIN: 144410
- Telephone code: 01826
- ISO 3166 code: IN-PB
- Vehicle registration: PB 37
- Post office: Phillaur
- Website: jalandhar.nic.in

Ashahoor (or Asha Hoor) is a medium size village in Phillaur tehsil of Jalandhar District of Punjab State, India. It is located 3.2 km from Nagar, 9 km from postal head office in Phillaur, 53 km from Jalandhar and 118 km from state capital Chandigarh. The village is administrated by a sarpanch who is an elected representative of the village as per Panchayati raj (India).

== Education ==
The village has a Punjabi medium, co-educational primary school (GPS Ashahoor School) founded in 1996. The schools provide mid-day meal prepared on school premises as per Indian Midday Meal Scheme.

== Transport ==
=== Rail ===
Phillaur Junction is the nearest train station however, Bhatian Railway Station is 13 km away from the village.

=== Air ===
The nearest domestic airport is located 41 km away in Ludhiana and the nearest international airport is located in Chandigarh also a second nearest international airport is 147 km away in Amritsar.
