= Sagarpur, Punjab =

Sagarpur
- Village
- Location in Punjab, India Sagarpur (India)
- Coordinates: 31.0874036°N 75.6336129°E
- Country: India
- State: Punjab
- District: Jalandhar

Government
  - Type: Panchayat raj
  - Body: Gram panchayat
- Elevation: 240 m (790 ft)

Population (2011)
  - Total: 927
- Sex ratio 474/453 ♂/♀

Languages
  - Official: Punjabi
- Time zone: UTC+5:30 (IST)
- PIN: 144039
- Telephone: 01821
- ISO 3166 code: IN-PB
- Vehicle registration: PB- 08
- Website: jalandhar.nic.in

Sagarpur is a village in Jalandhar district of Punjab State, India. It is located 6 km from Nurmahal, 18.5 km from Phillaur, 34 km from district headquarter Jalandhar and 129 km from state capital Chandigarh. The village is administrated by a sarpanch who is an elected representative.

== Transport ==
Nurmahal railway station is the nearest train station; however, Phillaur Junction train station is 17.9 km away from the village. The village is 47.7 km away from domestic airport in Ludhiana and the nearest international airport is located in Chandigarh also Sri Guru Ram Dass Jee International Airport is the second nearest airport which is 126 km away in Amritsar.
