= Baloki =

- Village
- Location in Punjab, India Baloki (India)
- Coordinates: 31.0213588°N 75.3899753°E
- Country: India
- State: Punjab
- District: Jalandhar
- Tehsil: Nakodar

Government
  - Type: Panchayat raj
  - Body: Gram panchayat
- Elevation: 240 m (790 ft)

Population (2011)
  - Total: 1,176
- Sex ratio 591/585 ♂/♀

Languages
  - Official: Punjabi
- Time zone: UTC+5:30 (IST)
- PIN: 144041
- ISO 3166 code: IN-PB
- Vehicle registration: PB- 08
- Website: jalandhar.nic.in

Baloki is a village near Nakodar in Jalandhar district of Punjab State, India. It is located 16.5 kilometres (10.3 mi) from Nakodar, 51 km (32 mi) from Kapurthala, 41.6 km (25.8 mi) from the district's headquarters, Jalandhar and 162 km (101 mi) from the state capital, Chandigarh. The village is administered by a sarpanch who is an elected representative of the village, as per Panchayati raj, a system of local self-government of villages in rural India.

== Transport ==
Nakodar railway station is the nearest train station, while Jalandhar City Junction railway station is 44 kilometres (27 mi) away from the village. The village is 70.6 km (43.9 mi) away from the domestic Ludhiana Airport and the nearest international airport is located in Chandigarh. Sri Guru Ram Das Ji International Airport is the second nearest airport, which is 121 km (75 mi) away in Amritsar.
