= Ashaur =

- Village
- Location in Punjab, India Ashaur (India)
- Coordinates: 31.0349254°N 75.8665433°E
- Country: India
- State: Punjab
- District: Jalandhar
- Tehsil: Phillaur

Government
  - Type: Panchayat raj
  - Body: Gram panchayat
- Elevation: 246 m (807 ft)

Population (2011)
  - Total: 1,349
- Sex ratio 699/650 ♂/♀

Languages
  - Official: Punjabi
- Time zone: UTC+5:30 (IST)
- PIN: 144410
- Telephone code: 01826
- ISO 3166 code: IN-PB
- Vehicle registration: PB 37
- Post office: Phillaur
- Website: jalandhar.nic.in

Ashaur is a medium size village in Phillaur tehsil of Jalandhar District of Punjab State, India. It is situated on Phillaur Nawanshahr Road and located 3.9 km from Nagar, 10 km from postal head office in Phillaur, 53 km from Jalandhar and 117 km from state capital Chandigarh. The village is administrated by a sarpanch who is an elected representative of village as per Panchayati raj (India).

== Caste ==
The village has a total population of 1,349 peoples with 274 houses. Schedule caste (SC) members constitute 32.47% of the population and the village does not have any Schedule Tribe (ST) population.

== Transport ==
=== Rail ===
Phillaur Junction is the nearest train station however, Bhatian Railway Station is 16 km away from the village.

=== Air ===
The nearest domestic airport is located 41 km away in Ludhiana and the nearest international airport is located in Chandigarh also a second nearest international airport is 148 km away in Amritsar.
