= Akbarpur Khurd =

- Village
- Location in Punjab, India Akbarpur Khurd (India)
- Coordinates: 31°3′3.2″N 75°23′31.2″E
- Country: India
- State: Punjab
- District: Jalandhar

Languages
  - Official: Punjabi
- Time zone: UTC+5:30 (IST)
- PIN: 144041
- Vehicle registration: PB- 08

Akbarpur Khurd village comes under the Nakodar tehsil of Jalandhar. Jalandhar is a district in the Indian state of Punjab. The village lies on the Shahkot-Mehatpur road. The nearest railway station to Akbarpur Khurd is Nakodar Railway station 13 km from it. Akbarpur Khurd's post office is Akbarpur Kalan whose PIN is 144041.
