= Akbarpur Kalan =

- Akbarpur Kalan Akbarpur Kalan (India)
- Coordinates: 31°3′43.88″N 75°22′28.87″E
- Country: India
- District: Jalandhar

Population (2011)
  - Total: 939
- Time zone: UTC+5:30 (IST)
- PIN: 144041
- Vehicle registration: PB- 08

Akbarpur Kalan is a village in Nakodar tehsil in Jalandhar district of Indian state of Punjab. Akbarpur Kalan is 11.3 kilometres (7.0 mi) far from its Mandal Main Town Nakodar. Akbarpur Kalan is located 36.8 kilometres (22.9 mi) distance from its district headquarters of Jalandhar - West. It is located 137 kilometres (85 mi) distance from the state Chandigarh. Akbarpur Kalan lies on the Shahkot-Mehatpur road at a distance of 2 km from it. The nearest Railway station to this village is at Nakodar about of 13 kilometres (8.1 mi) from Akbarpur Kalan.

== Post Code ==
Akbarpur Kalan's PIN code is 144041.
