= Aladinpur =

- Village
- Location in Punjab, India Aladinpur (India)
- Coordinates: 31°17′01″N 75°38′42″E
- Country: India
- State: Punjab
- District: Jalandhar
- Tehsil: Jalandhar - I

Government
  - Type: Panchayat raj
  - Body: Gram panchayat

Area
  - Total: 21 ha (52 acres)

Population (2011)
  - Total: 734; 374/360 ♂/♀
  - Scheduled Castes: 570; 282/288 ♂/♀
  - Total Households: 158

Languages
  - Official: Punjabi
- Time zone: UTC+5:30 (IST)
- ISO 3166 code: IN-PB
- Vehicle registration: PB-08
- Website: jalandhar.gov.in

Aladinpur is a village in Jalandhar - I in Jalandhar district of Punjab State, India. It is located 15 kilometres (9.3 mi) from district headquarter. The village is administrated by Sarpanch an elected representative of the village.

== Demography ==
As of the 2011 Census of India, the village has a total number of 158 houses and the population of 734 of which 374 are males while 360 are females. According to the report published by Census India in 2011, out of the total population of the village 570 people are from Schedule Caste and the village does not have any Schedule Tribe population so far.

== See also ==
- List of villages in India
