= Sanoura =

- village
- Location in Punjab, India Sanoura (India)
- Coordinates: 31.581716°N 75.646491°E
- Country: India
- State: Punjab
- District: Jalandhar
- Elevation: 232 m (761 ft)

Population (2001)
  - Total: 2,000

Languages
  - Official: Punjabi
- Time zone: UTC+5:30 (IST)
- PIN: 144201
- Vehicle registration: PB- 08

Sanoura is a village in Jalandhar district in the state of Punjab, India.
