= Partappura =

- Village
- Location in Punjab, India Partappura (India)
- Country: India
- State: Punjab
- District: Jalandhar
- Tehsil: Phillaur

Government
  - Type: Panchayat raj
  - Body: Gram panchayat

Area
  - Total: 687.44 ha (1,698.7 acres)

Population (2011)
  - Total: 2,770; 1,380/1,390 ♂/♀
  - Scheduled Castes: 1,266; 635/631 ♂/♀
  - Total Households: 610

Languages
  - Official: Punjabi
- Time zone: UTC+5:30 (IST)
- Telephone: 01826
- ISO 3166 code: IN-PB
- Vehicle registration: PB-37
- Website: jalandhar.gov.in

Partappura is a village in Phillaur in Jalandhar district of Punjab State, India. It is located 10 kilometres (6.2 mi) from sub-district headquarter and 50 kilometres (31 mi) from district headquarter. The village is administrated by Sarpanch an elected representative of the village.

== Demography ==
As of 2011, the village has a total number of 610 houses and a population of 2770 of which 1380 are males while 1390 are females. According to the report published by Census India in 2011, out of the total population of the village 1266 people are from Schedule Caste and the village does not have any Schedule Tribe population so far.

== See also ==
- Lohar
- List of villages in India
