= Sarnana =

- Village
- Location in Punjab, India Sarnana (India)
- Coordinates: 31.3328686°N 75.698542°E
- Country: India
- State: Punjab
- District: Jalandhar
- Tehsil: Jalandhar - I

Government
  - Type: Panchayat raj
  - Body: Gram panchayat

Area
  - Total: 6 ha (15 acres)
- Elevation: 431 m (1,414 ft)

Population (2011)
  - Total: 536; 287/249 ♂/♀
  - Scheduled Castes: 232; 126/106 ♂/♀
  - Total Households: 119

Languages
  - Official: Punjabi
- Time zone: UTC+5:30 (IST)
- ISO 3166 code: IN-PB
- Vehicle registration: PB-08
- Website: jalandhar.gov.in

Sarnana is a village in Jalandhar - I in Jalandhar district of Punjab State, India. It is located 15 kilometres (9.3 mi) from district headquarter. The village is administrated by Sarpanch an elected representative of the village.

== Demography ==
As of 2011, the village has a total number of 119 houses and a population of 536 of which 287 are males while 249 are females. According to the report published by Census India in 2011, out of the total population of the village 232 people are from Schedule Caste and the village does not have any Schedule Tribe population so far.

== See also ==
- List of villages in India
