= Aidalpur =

- village
- Location in Punjab (India) Aidalpur (India)
- Coordinates: 31°03′N 75°19′E
- Country: India
- State: Punjab
- District: Jalandhar

Languages
- Time zone: UTC+5:30 (IST)
- PIN: None
- Vehicle registration: PB- 08

Aidalpur is a village in Shahkot. Shahkot is a town in the district Jalandhar of the Indian state of Punjab.

== About ==
The nearest main road to Aidalpur is Shahkot- Mogan at a distance of 3 kilometres (1.9 mi) and the nearest railway station is Shahkot Malkian at a distance of 7 kilometres (4.3 mi).

== Post code ==
Aidalpur's Post office is Barsalian. It has no PIN code of its own, because it only services itself and/or a neighbouring village
