= Aliwal, Jalandhar =

Aliwal
- Village
- Location in Punjab, India Aliwal (India)
- Coordinates: 31.137717°N 75.267485°E
- Country: India
- State: Punjab
- District: Jalandhar

Languages
  - Official: Punjabi
- Time zone: UTC+5:30 (IST)
- PIN: 144701
- Vehicle registration: PB- 08

Aliwal village comes under the Jalandhar East development block of Jalandhar. Jalandhar is a district in the Indian state of Punjab.

== About ==
Aliwal lies on the Shahkot-Lohian road. Via phull-turna. The nearest railway station to Aliwal is Mulewal Khaira Railway station at 4 km from it.

== Post Code ==
Aliwal's PIN is 144701.
