= Chuharwali =

- Village
- Location in Punjab, India Chuharwali (India)
- Coordinates: 31.39972°N 75.6704485°E
- Country: India
- State: Punjab
- District: Jalandhar

Government
  - Type: Panchayat raj
  - Body: Gram panchayat
- Elevation: 240 m (790 ft)
- 50000+

Languages
  - Official: Punjabi
- Time zone: UTC+5:30 (IST)
- ISO 3166 code: IN-PB
- Website: jalandhar.nic.in

Chuharwali is a village in Jalandhar district of Punjab State, India. It is located 17 kilometres (11 mi) from district headquarter Jalandhar and 155 kilometres (96 mi) from state capital Chandigarh. The village is administrated by a sarpanch who is an elected representative of village as per Panchayati raj (India).

== See also ==
- List of villages in India
