= Ambgarh =

Ambhgarh
- Village
- Nickname: Mini chandigarh
- Location in Punjab, India Ambhgarh (India)
- Coordinates: 31.44051°N 75.54187°E
- Country: India
- State: Punjab
- District: Jalandhar

Area
  - Total: 5 km^{2} (1.9 sq mi)
  - Rank: 1

Languages
  - Official: Punjabi
- Time zone: UTC+5:30 (IST)
- PIN
- Vehicle registration: PB- 08

Ambgarh village comes under the Jalandhar West development block of Jalandhar. Jalandhar is a district in the Indian state of Punjab.

Ambgarh lies on the Kartarpur-Kishangarh road. The nearest railway station to Ambgarh is Kartarpur Railway station at 4 km from it.

Ambgarh's post office is Rahimpur.
