= Chandpur, Punjab =

Chandpur
- Village
- Location in Punjab, India Chandpur (India)
- Coordinates: 31.3310907°N 75.6677824°E
- Country: India
- State: Punjab
- District: Jalandhar

Government
  - Type: Panchayat raj
  - Body: Gram panchayat
- Elevation: 240 m (790 ft)

Languages
  - Official: Punjabi
- Time zone: UTC+5:30 (IST)
- ISO 3166 code: IN-PB
- Vehicle registration: PB- 08
- Website: jalandhar.nic.in

Chandpur is a village in Jalandhar district of Punjab State, India. It is located 13 kilometres (8.1 mi) from its district's headquarters, Jalandhar, and 145 kilometres (90 mi) from the state capital, Chandigarh. The village is administrated by a sarpanch who is an elected representative of village as per Panchayati raj (India).

== See also ==
- List of villages in India
