= Mianwal Araian =

- Village
- Location in Punjab, India Mianwal Araian (India)
- Coordinates: 31.0908635°N 75.2863417°E
- Country: India
- State: Punjab
- District: Jalandhar
- Tehsil: Shahkot

Government
  - Type: Panchayat raj
  - Body: Gram panchayat
- Elevation: 240 m (790 ft)

Population (2011)
  - Total: 1,093
- Sex ratio 560/533 ♂/♀

Languages
  - Official: Punjabi
- Time zone: UTC+5:30 (IST)
- ISO 3166 code: IN-PB
- Vehicle registration: PB- 08
- Website: jalandhar.nic.in

Mianwal Araian is a village in Shahkot tehsil in Jalandhar district, Punjab. It is located 4 kilometres (2.5 mi) from the city of Shahkot, 46 kilometres (29 mi) from the city of Jalandhar, and 177 kilometres (110 mi) from the state capital Chandigarh. The village is led by an elected sarpanch.
