= Chachowal =

Village in Jalandhar district, Punjab, India

Coordinates: 31.228°N 75.654°E

Chachowal is a village in Jalandhar district, Punjab, India. The village is governed by a Gram Panchayat.

The village has a population of 760 people, spanning 152 households.

Before partition, it was a Muslim dominated village. At the time of partition of subcontinent, Muslims of this village migrated to a village (Chak 17/70) in district Nankana Sahib in Punjab Pakistan.
