= Allowal =

- village
- Location in Punjab, India Allowal (India)
- Coordinates: 31.154066°N 75.485468°E
- Country: India
- State: Punjab
- District: Jalandhar
- Talukas: Nakodar

Languages
  - Official: Punjabi
  - Regional: Punjabi
- Time zone: UTC+5:30 (IST)
- Telephone code: 0181
- Nearest city: Nakodar

Allowal is a small village in Nakodar. Nakodar is a tehsil in the city Jalandhar of Indian state of Punjab.

== About ==
Allowal lies on the Nakodar-Jalandhar road. It is almost 3 km from Nakodar bus stand. The nearest main road to Allowal is Nakodar-Jalandhar road. The nearest Railway station to this village is Nakodar Railway station.

== STD code ==
Allowal's STD code is 01821.
