= Salaich =

- Village
- Location in Punjab, India Salaich (India)
- Coordinates: 31.088589°N 75.3145276°E
- Country: India
- State: Punjab
- District: Jalandhar
- Tehsil: Shahkot

Government
  - Type: Panchayat raj
  - Body: Gram panchayat
- Elevation: 240 m (790 ft)

Population (2011)
  - Total: 948
- Sex ratio 489/459 ♂/♀

Languages
  - Official: Punjabi
- Time zone: UTC+5:30 (IST)
- ISO 3166 code: IN-PB
- Vehicle registration: PB- 08
- Website: jalandhar.nic.in

Salaich is a village in Shahkot in Jalandhar district of Punjab State, India. It is located 2.4 kilometres (1.5 mi) from Shahkot, 19.5 kilometres (12.1 mi) from Nakodar, 43 kilometres (27 mi) from district headquarter Jalandhar and 174 kilometres (108 mi) from state capital Chandigarh. The village is administrated by a sarpanch who is an elected representative of village as per Panchayati raj (India).

== Demography ==
As of 2011, Qadian has a total of 201 houses and a population of 948, of which 489 are males while 459 are females according to the report published by Census India in 2011. The literacy rate of the village is 81.31%, higher than the state average of 75.84%. The population of children under the age of 6 years is 108 which is 11.39% of total population of the village, and child sex ratio is approximately 662 lower than state average of 846.

Most of the people are from Schedule Caste which constitutes 53.06% of the total population in the village. The town does not have any Schedule Tribe population so far.

As per census 2011, 337 people were engaged in work activities out of the total population of the village which includes 287 males and 50 females. According to census survey report 2011, 95.55% of workers describe their work as their main activity, and 4.45% of workers are involved in marginal activity providing livelihood for less than 6 months.

== Transport ==
Shahkot Malisian station is the nearest train station. The village is 80 kilometres (50 mi) away from domestic airport in Ludhiana and the nearest international airport is located in Chandigarh also Sri Guru Ram Dass Jee International Airport is the second nearest airport which is 113 kilometres (70 mi) away in Amritsar.

== See also ==
- List of villages in India
