= Ambia Tohva =

Coordinates: 31°27′39″N 75°31′57″E

Ambia Tohva is a village in the Jalandhar district, near the town of Kartarpur, in Punjab, India.
