= Nizamudinpur =

- Village
- Location in Punjab, India Nizamudinpur (India)
- Coordinates: 31.4714997°N 75.6169702°E
- Country: India
- State: Punjab
- District: Jalandhar
- Tehsil: Jalandhar - I

Government
  - Type: Panchayat raj
  - Body: Gram panchayat

Area
  - Total: 130.4 ha (322 acres)

Population (2011)
  - Total: 770; 404/366 ♂/♀
  - Scheduled Castes: 331; 181/150 ♂/♀
  - Total Households: 154

Languages
  - Official: Punjabi
- Time zone: UTC+5:30 (IST)
- ISO 3166 code: IN-PB
- Vehicle registration: PB-08
- Website: jalandhar.gov.in

Nizamudinpur is a village in Jalandhar - I in Jalandhar district of Punjab State, India. It is located 16 kilometres (9.9 mi) from district headquarter. The village is administrated by Sarpanch an elected representative of the village.

== Demography ==
As of 2011, the village has a total number of 154 houses and a population of 770 of which 404 are males while 366 are females. According to the report published by Census India in 2011, out of the total population of the village 331 people are from Schedule Caste and the village does not have any Schedule Tribe population so far.

== See also ==
- List of villages in India
