= Baghela =

- Village
- Location in Punjab, India Baghela (India)
- Coordinates: 30°59′36.20″N 75°28′54.37″E
- Country: India
- State: Punjab
- District: Jalandhar
- Tehsil: Nakodar

Government
  - Type: Panchayat raj
  - Body: Gram panchayat

Area
  - Total: 586 ha (1,450 acres)
- Elevation: 240 m (790 ft)

Population (2011)
  - Total: 1,822
  - Density: 311/km^{2} (805/sq mi)
  - Scheduled Castes: 925; 476/449 ♂/♀
  - Total Households: 318
- Sex ratio 936/886 ♂/♀

Languages
  - Official: Punjabi
- Time zone: UTC+5:30 (IST)
- PIN: 144041
- Telephone: 01821
- ISO 3166 code: IN-PB
- Vehicle registration: PB- 08
- Post office: Mehatpur (Jalandhar)
- Website: jalandhar.gov.in

Baghela is a village in Nakodar in Jalandhar district of Punjab State, India. It is located 19 kilometres (12 mi) from sub district headquarter and 44 kilometres (27 mi) from district headquarter. The village is administrated by Sarpanch an elected representative of the village as per Panchayati raj (India).

It is located 8.4 km from postal head office Mehatpur (Jalandhar), 52 km from Kapurthala, 52.9 km from district headquarter Jalandhar and 141 km from state capital Chandigarh.

== Demography ==
As of 2011, the village has a total number of 318 houses and a population of 1822 of which 936 are males while 886 are females. According to the report published by Census India in 2011, out of the total population of the village 925 people are from Schedule Caste and the village does not have any Schedule Tribe population so far.

== Transport ==
Nurmahal railway station is the nearest train station however, Phillaur Junction train station is 30 km away from the village. The village is 59 km away from domestic airport in Ludhiana and the nearest international airport is located in Chandigarh also Sri Guru Ram Dass Jee International Airport is the second nearest airport which is 130 km away in Amritsar.

== See also ==
- List of villages in India
