= Aujla Dhak =

- Village
- Location in Punjab, India Aujla Dhak (India)
- Coordinates: 31.1390449°N 75.8933186°E
- Country: India
- State: Punjab
- District: Jalandhar
- Tehsil: Phillaur

Government
  - Body: Gram panchayat
- Elevation: 246 m (807 ft)

Languages
  - Official: Punjabi
- Time zone: UTC+5:30 (IST)
- Telephone code: 01826
- ISO 3166 code: IN-PB
- Vehicle registration: PB 37
- Website: jalandhar.nic.in

Aujla Dhak is a village in Phillaur tehsil of Jalandhar District of Punjab State, India. It is located 6.4 km away from Mukandpur, 14 km from Goraya, 39 km from Jalandhar, and 113 km from state capital Chandigarh. The village is administrated by a sarpanch who is an elected representative of village as per Panchayati raj (India). Home of the AUJLA family.

== Education ==
The village has a co-ed primary school (Pri Aujla Dhak School) founded in 1955 which also school provide a mid-day meal as per the Indian Midday Meal Scheme.

== Transport ==
=== Rail ===
The nearest train station is situated 21 km away in Goraya and Phagwara Junction Railway Station is 23 km away from the village.

=== Air ===
The nearest domestic airport is 53 km away in Ludhiana and the nearest international airport is 139 km away in Amritsar other nearest international airport is located in Chandigarh.
