= Akuwal =

- Village
- Interactive map of Akuwal
- Coordinates: 30°59′11.32″N 75°38′23.35″E
- Country: India
- State: Punjab
- District: Jalandhar

Languages
  - Official: Punjabi
- Time zone: UTC+5:30 (IST)
- PIN
- Vehicle registration: PB- 08

Akuwal village comes under the Nurmahal development block of Jalandhar. Jalandhar is a district in the Indian state of Punjab.

== About ==
Akuwal lies on the Phillaur-Nakodar road. The nearest railway station to Akuwal is Bilga Railway station at 12 km from it.

== Post code ==
Akuwal's post office is Talwaj.
