= Kotli Jamiat Singh =

- Village
- Location in Punjab, India Kotli Jamiat Singh (India)
- Coordinates: 31.3646399°N 75.7601577°E
- Country: India
- State: Punjab
- District: Jalandhar

Government
  - Type: Panchayat raj
  - Body: Gram panchayat
- Elevation: 240 m (790 ft)

Languages
  - Official: Punjabi
- Time zone: UTC+5:30 (IST)
- ISO 3166 code: IN-PB
- Vehicle registration: PB- 08
- Website: jalandhar.nic.in

Kotli Jamiat Singh is a village in Jalandhar district of Punjab State, India. It is located 26 kilometres (16 mi) from district headquarter Jalandhar and 144 kilometres (89 mi) from state capital Chandigarh. The village is administrated by a sarpanch who is an elected representative of village as per Panchayati raj (India).

== See also ==
- List of villages in India
