= Goalpind =

- Village
- Location in Punjab, India Goalpind (India)
- Coordinates: 31.4370394°N 75.676969°E
- Country: India
- State: Punjab
- District: Jalandhar

Government
  - Type: Panchayat raj
  - Body: Gram panchayat
- Elevation: 240 m (790 ft)

Languages
  - Official: Punjabi
- Time zone: UTC+5:30 (IST)
- ISO 3166 code: IN-PB
- Website: jalandhar.nic.in

Goalpind is a village in Jalandhar district of Punjab State, India. It is located 21 kilometres (13 mi) from district headquarter Jalandhar and 163 kilometres (101 mi) from state capital Chandigarh. The village is administrated by a sarpanch who is an elected representative of village as per Panchayati raj (India).

== See also ==
- List of villages in India
