= Boparai Khurd =

- Village
- Location in Punjab, India Boparai Khurd (India)
- Coordinates: 31.1235°N 75.743°E
- Country: India
- State: Punjab
- District: Jalandhar
- Elevation: 234 m (768 ft)

Population (2007)
  - Total: 2,300
  - Density: 267/km^{2} (690/sq mi)

Languages
  - Official: Punjabi
- Time zone: UTC+5:30 (IST)
- PIN: 144409
- Telephone code: +91-1826
- Vehicle registration: PB-37
- Sex ratio: 986 ♂/♀
- Literacy: 51%%

Boparai pind called just Boparai is a village in Phillaur tahsil of Jalandhar district, Punjab, India. Boparai comes under the goraya development block of Jalandhar.
