= Prakash Chandra Sood =

Indian nuclear physicist (born 1928)

Prakash Chandra Sood Padma Shri
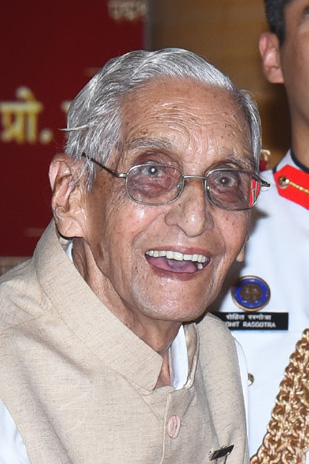
- Prof. Sood in 2023
- Born: 1 October 1928 (age 98); Jalandhar, Punjab, India
- Education: Punjab University
- Occupations: Nuclear scientist, researcher, and professor
- Employers: Banaras Hindu University; BARC
- Known for: Teaching nuclear science to 3 generations
- Awards: Padma Shri

Prakash Chandra Sood (born 1 October 1928) is a nuclear physicist and professor of nuclear physics from Punjab, India. Sood is known for his tenure at the Banaras Hindu University(BHU), where he served as the head of Physics department in 1969 and later set up the first Van de Graffe Accelerator at BHU. In 2023, he was awarded one of India's highest civilian award Padma Shri for literature and education.

== Early life and education ==
Prakash Chandra Sood was born in 1928 in Jalandhar. He gained B.Sc. and M.Sc. degrees in 1952 from Punjab University.

== Career ==
After education, Sood joined his alma mater Punjab University as a teacher in 1960. In 1965, Sood went to Alberta University, Canada as a visiting professor. In 1968, he was appointed as a scientific officer in India's Bhabha Atomic Research Centre. In 1969, he joined University of California, United States.

In 1969, Sood returned to India to join as the Head of Physics department at the Banaras Hindu University (BHU). Sood continued till 1991 at the BHU, where he trained several generations of nuclear scientists and researchers. He was the founder-director of the first computer centre at BHU and set up the first Van de Graffe Accelerator there among other new facilities.

== Awards and honors ==
Prakash Chandra Sood is a fellow of The National Academy of Sciences (FNASc).

In 2015, he was named the "Senior Most Active Nuclear Scientist of India" by the Department of Atomic Energy, Government of India.

In 2023, Sood was awarded the Padma Shri, one of India's highest civilian awarded by the Government of India.
