= Dhandwar =

Coordinates: 26°10′N 83°55′E

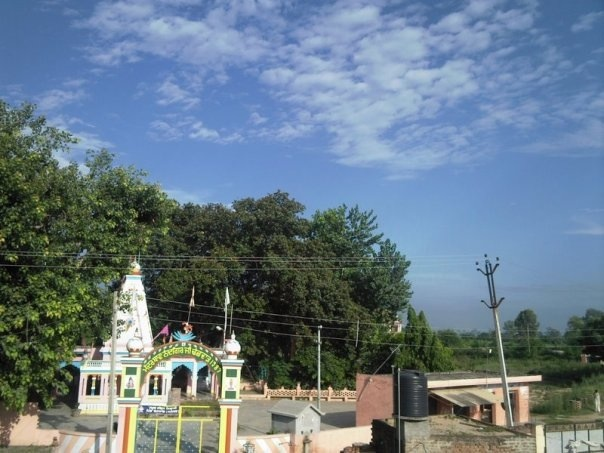
- Interactive map of Dhandwar
- Country: India
- Region: Punjab
- Tehsil: Phillaur
- District: Jalandhar
- Website: www.facebook.com/dhandwars

Dhandwar is a village in Jalandhar district, Phillaur, Punjab, India. It is near Dosanjh Kalan and Apra. According to the voter list of September 2018, around 1150 people over 18 age live in the village.
