= Akbarpur (meteorite) =

Meteorite found in India

- Type: Chondrite
- Class: Ordinary chondrite
- Group: H4
- Country: India
- Region: Uttar Pradesh
- Coordinates: 29°43′N 77°57′E
- Observed fall: Yes
- Fall date: 18 April 1838
- TKW: 1800 g

Akbarpur is an H chondrite meteorite that fell to earth on 18 April 1838, in Uttar Pradesh, India. It is notable for being the first Indian meteorite for which an official report accompanied by a legal deposition was filed. It is a polymict that belongs to the petrologic type 4, thus was assigned to the group H4. Its surface features regmaglypts.

== See also ==
- Glossary of meteoritics
- Meteorite falls
- Ordinary chondrite
