= Atti, Jalandhar =

Atti
- Village
- Location in Punjab, India Atti (India)
- Coordinates: 31.0856218°N 75.8061899°E
- Country: India
- State: Punjab
- District: Jalandhar
- Tehsil: Phillaur
- Elevation: 246 m (807 ft)

Population (2011)
  - Total: 1,579
- Sex ratio 791/788 ♂/♀

Languages
  - Official: Punjabi
  - Other spoken: Hindi
- Time zone: UTC+5:30 (IST)
- PIN: 144418
- Telephone code: 01826
- ISO 3166 code: IN-PB
- Vehicle registration: PB 37
- Post office: Bara Pind
- Website: jalandhar.nic.in

Atti is a village in Phillaur tehsil of Jalandhar District of Punjab State, India. It is located 2 km away from national highway 1 and 3.5 km away from postal head office Bara Pind. The village is 7 km away from Goraya, 12 km from Phillaur, 40 km from Jalandhar, and 121 km from state capital Chandigarh. The village is administrated by Sarpanch who is elected representative of village.

== Caste ==
The village has population of 1579 and most of the villagers are from schedule caste (SC), constituting 38.19% of the total population. The village doesn't have any Schedule Tribe (ST) population.

== Education ==
Atti has a Co-educational Primary with Upper Primary and Secondary school (Shri Dashmesh Convent S. Atti School) which was founded in 1999.

== Transport ==
=== Rail ===
The nearest train station is situated in Goraya and Ludhiana Jn Railway Station is 25 km away from the village.

=== Air ===
The nearest domestic airport is 43 km away in Ludhiana and the nearest international airport is 135 km away in Amritsar other nearest international airport is located in Chandigarh.
