= Athola =

- Village
- Location in Punjab, India Athola (India)
- Coordinates: 31.3144973°N 75.4552603°E
- Country: India
- State: Punjab
- District: Jalandhar

Languages
  - Official: Punjabi
- Time zone: UTC+5:30 (IST)
- PIN: 144002
- Vehicle registration: PB- 08

Athola is a village in Jalandhar. Jalandhar is a district in the Indian state of Punjab.

== About ==
Athola lies on the Jalandhar-Kapurthala road. The nearest railway station to Athola is Khojowal Railway station at 4 km from it.

== Post code ==
Athola's post code is 144002.
