= Kandola, Punjab =

Kandola
- Village
- Location in Punjab, India Kandola (India)
- Coordinates: 31.4201761°N 75.7490372°E
- Country: India
- State: Punjab
- District: Jalandhar

Government
  - Type: Panchayat raj
  - Body: Gram panchayat
- Elevation: 240 m (790 ft)

Languages
  - Official: Punjabi
- Time zone: UTC+5:30 (IST)
- ISO 3166 code: IN-PB
- Website: jalandhar.nic.in

Kandola is a village in Jalandhar district of Punjab State, India. It is located 27 kilometres (17 mi) from district headquarter Jalandhar and 151 kilometres (94 mi) from state capital Chandigarh. The village is administrated by sarpanch Gary Kandola who is an elected representative of village as per Panchayati raj (India).

== See also ==
- List of villages in India
