= Kala Bakra =

- Village
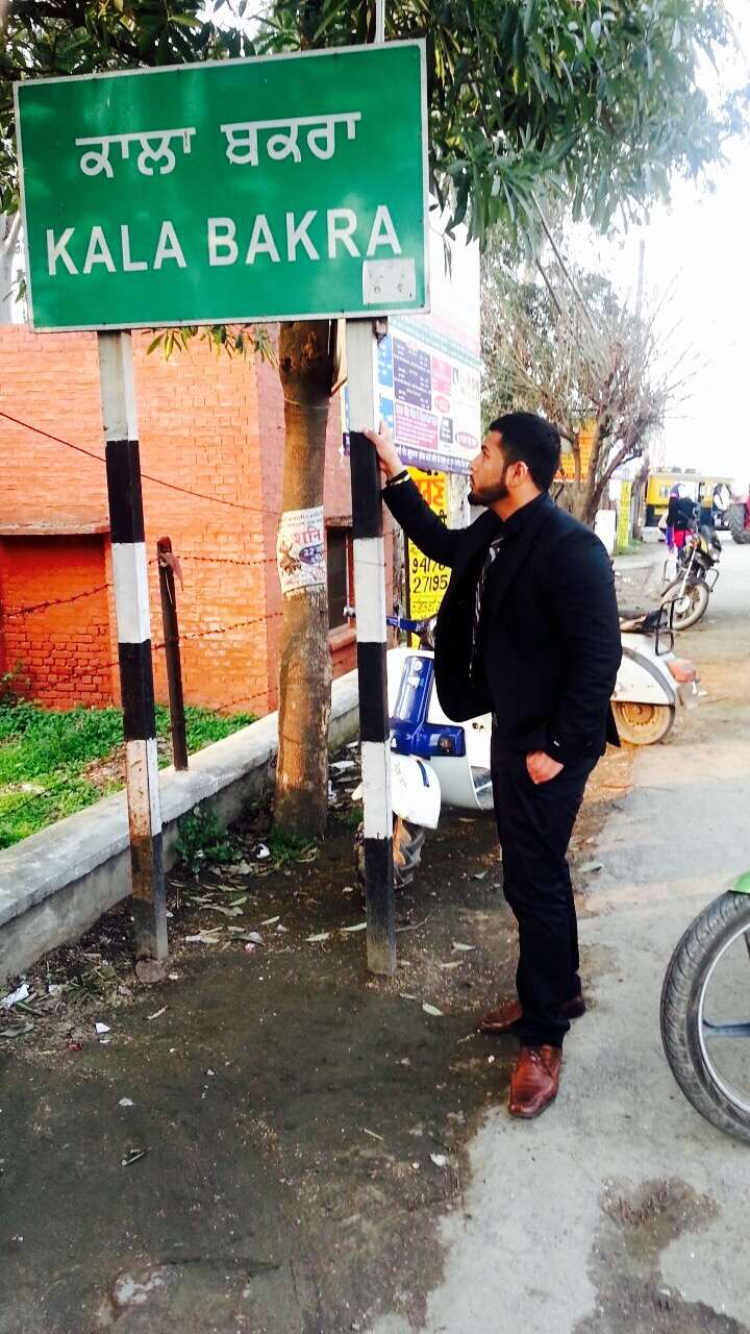
- Kala Bakra Railway Station
- Country: India
- State: Punjab
- District: Jalandhar

Languages
  - Official: Punjabi
- Time zone: UTC+5:30 (IST)
- PIN: 144303
- Telephone code: 0181

Kala Bakra village comes under the Bhogpur development block of Jalandhar district in the Indian state of Punjab. Its name means "black goat".

== About ==
Kala Bakra is very delicious village in Jalandhar-Pathankot road. Its area is 454 hectares with a population of 2,456 individuals (according to the 1991 census). The village has its own primary and secondary school, railway station and government hospital. Kala Bakra is locally known as the home of Gurbachan Singh Rai, a local wrestling champion and officer in the British Indian Army who was award the Order of British India Medal for his service. The Rai family remain prominent in the village today.

== Post Code and STD Code ==
Kala Bakra's post and STD codes are 144303 and 0181 respectively.

== See also ==
- Aemakazi
