= Mustafapur =

Mos ta fa pur
- Location in Bangladesh
- Coordinates: 23°28′0″N 90°39′0″E
- Country: Bangladesh
- Division: Chittagong Division
- District: Chandpur District
- Time zone: UTC+6 (Bangladesh Time)

Mostafapur is a village in Chandpur district in the Chittagong Division of Bangladesh. Its population was 2,000 (present 2011). Number of houses in the village is sixteen.

The Member of Parliament is Rafiqul Islam who has represented the area since 2008.

GeoNameId: 1193875
