= Akbarpur, Agra =

Coordinates: 27°06′49″N 78°04′30″E

Akbarpur
- Village
- Interactive map of Akbarpur
- Country: India
- District: Agra
- State: Uttar Pradesh

Population (2011)
  - Total: 2,498

Akbarpur is a village in Agra tehsil of Agra district, Uttar Pradesh state of India.

== Demographics ==
As of 2011 Indian Census, Akbarpur had a total population of 2,498, of which 1,323 were males and 1,175 were females. Population within the age group of 0–6 years was 439.
