= Nadala =

- City
- Location in Punjab, India Nadala (India)
- Coordinates: 31.545754°N 75.438843°E
- Country: India
- State: Punjab
- District: Kapurthala

Government
  - Type: Municipal Corporation(India)
  - Body: Municipality

Languages
  - Official: Punjabi
  - Other spoken: Hindi
- Time zone: UTC+5:30 (IST)
- PIN: 144624
- Telephone code: 01822
- ISO 3166 code: IN-PB
- Vehicle registration: PB-09

Nadala is a city in Bholath Tehsil in Kapurthala district of Punjab, India. It is located 6 kilometres (3.7 mi) from Bhulath, 21 kilometres (13 mi) away from the district headquarters Kapurthala. The city is administered by a municipal councillor who is an elected representative of the city.
