= Akbarpur, Paliganj =

Akbarpur is a village in Paliganj block is one of the biggest villages in Patna district. It is located 52 km from district headquarter Patna.

Akbarpur Pin code is 804401. This place is border of Patan district, Arwal, Jehanabad and Bhojpur.
