= Kohala, Mysore =

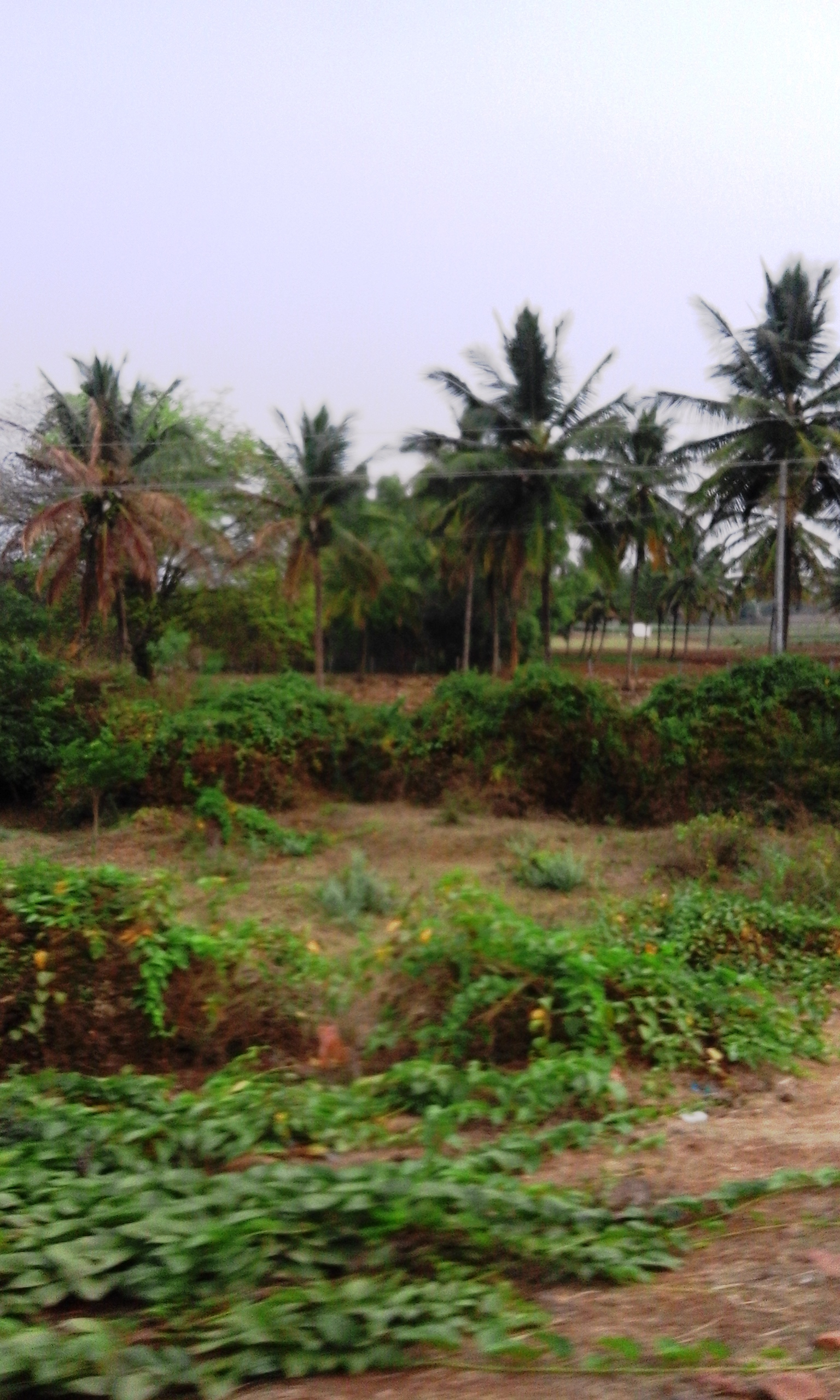
Kohala, Mysore

Kohala is a small village near Mysore in Karnataka province of India.

== Location ==
Kohala is located on the Mananthavady road at a distance of 197 km (122 mi) from the provincial capital of Bangalore. The Postal code of Kohala is 571125-Hampapura. The nearby villages are Nanjangud and Krishnarajasagara.

== Education ==
The government Lower Primary school is the only educational organization of Kohala.
