= Diwali (village) =

- Village
- Location in Punjab, India Diwali (India)
- Coordinates: 31.2137143°N 75.6117725°E
- Country: India
- State: Punjab
- District: Jalandhar

Government
  - Type: Panchayat raj
  - Body: Gram panchayat
- Elevation: 240 m (790 ft)

Languages
  - Official: Punjabi
- Time zone: UTC+5:30 (IST)
- ISO 3166 code: IN-PB
- Vehicle registration: PB- 08
- Website: jalandhar.nic.in

Diwali is a village in Jalandhar district of Punjab State, India. It is located 14 kilometres (8.7 mi) from the district headquarters Jalandhar and 149 kilometres (93 mi) from the state capital Chandigarh. The village is administered by a sarpanch who is an elected representative of the village as per Panchayati raj (India).

== See also ==
- List of villages in India
