= Pinn Island =

Island in Antarctica

- Location within Antarctica

Geography
- Location: Antarctica
- Coordinates: 67°34′S 47°55′E

Administration
- Administered under the Antarctic Treaty System

Demographics
- Population: Uninhabited

Pinn Island is an island lying close off the northeast end of McKinnon Island, off the coast of Enderby Land. Plotted from ANARE (Australian National Antarctic Research Expeditions) air photos in 1956 and visited by an ANARE party in October 1957. Named by Antarctic Names Committee of Australia (ANCA) for John Pinn, geophysicist at Mawson Station in 1957.

== See also ==
- List of Antarctic and sub-Antarctic islands
