= Akbarpur, Kapurthala =

Akbarpur
- Village
- Location in Punjab, India Akbarpur (India)
- Coordinates: 31.5423317°N 75.5058241°E
- Country: India
- State: Punjab
- District: Kapurthala

Government
  - Type: Panchayati raj (India)
  - Body: Gram panchayat

Languages
  - Official: Punjabi
  - Other spoken: Hindi
- Time zone: UTC+5:30 (IST)
- Telephone code: 01822
- ISO 3166 code: IN-PB
- Vehicle registration: PB-09
- Website: kapurthala.gov.in

Akbarpur is a village located in Kapurthala district, Punjab.

== Demography ==
As per Population Census 2011, the Akbarpur village has population of 1157 of which 600 are males while 557 are females. The village is administrated by Sarpanch an elected representative of the village. The population of children under the age of 6 years is 121 which is 10.46% of total population of Akbarpur, and child sex ratio is approximately 1161 higher than state average of 846.

As per census 2011, 342 people were engaged in work activities out of the total population of Akbarpur which includes 340 males and 22 females. According to census survey report 2011, 99.42% workers describe their work as main work and 0.58% workers are involved in Marginal activity providing livelihood for less than 6 months.

== Caste ==
The village has schedule caste (SC) constitutes 19.27% of total population of the village and it doesn't have any Schedule Tribe (ST) population.

== Population data ==
Particulars	Total	Male	Female
Total No. of Houses	250	-	-
Population	1,157	600	557
Child (0–6)	121	56	65
Schedule Caste	223	119	104
Schedule Tribe	0	0	0
Literacy	74.52%	77.94 %	70.73 %
Total Workers	342	320	22
Main Worker	340	0	0
Marginal Worker	2	1	1
