= Akbarpur, Bhulath =

Akbarpur
- Village
- Location in Punjab, India Akbarpur (India)
- Coordinates: 31.421372°N 75.258115°E
- Country: India
- State: Punjab
- District: Kapurthala

Government
  - Type: Panchayati raj (India)
  - Body: Gram panchayat

Population (2011)
  - Total: 1,175
- Sex ratio 584/591♂/♀

Languages
  - Official: Punjabi
  - Other spoken: Hindi
- Time zone: UTC+5:30 (IST)
- PIN: 144636
- Telephone code: 01822
- ISO 3166 code: IN-PB
- Vehicle registration: PB-09
- Website: kapurthala.gov.in

Akbarpur is a village in Bhulath Tehsil in Kapurthala district of Punjab State, India. It is located 27 kilometres (17 mi) from Bhulath, 37 kilometres (23 mi) away from district headquarter Kapurthala. The village is administrated by a Sarpanch, who is an elected representative.

== Demography ==
According to the report published by Census India in 2011, Akbarpur has 268 houses with the total population of 1,175 persons of which 584 are male and 591 females. Literacy rate of Akbarpur is 75.07%, lower than the state average of 75.84%. The population of children in the age group 0–6 years is 128 which is 10.89% of the total population. Child sex ratio is approximately 600, lower than the state average of 846.

== Population data ==
Particulars	Total	Male	Female
Total No. of Houses	268	-	-
Population	1,175	584	591
Child (0–6)	128	80	48
Schedule Caste	564	290	274
Schedule Tribe	0	0	0
Literacy	75.07 %	85.12 %	65.75 %
Total Workers	294	264	30
Main Worker	275	0	0
Marginal Worker	19	17	2

As per census 2011, 294 people were engaged in work activities out of the total population of Akbarpur which includes 264 males and 30 females. According to census survey report 2011, 93.54% workers (Employment or Earning more than 6 Months) describe their work as main work and 6.46% workers are involved in Marginal activity providing livelihood for less than 6 months.

== Caste ==
The village has schedule caste (SC) constitutes 48.00% of total population of the village and it doesn't have any Schedule Tribe (ST) population.

== List of cities near the village ==
- Bhulath
- Kapurthala
- Phagwara
- Sultanpur Lodhi

== Air travel connectivity ==
The closest International airport to the village is Sri Guru Ram Dass Jee International Airport.

== See also ==
- List of things named after Akbar
