= Sri Guru Ravidas Airport =

Airport serving Jalandhar, Punjab, India

Shri Guru Ravidass Maharaj Ji Airport
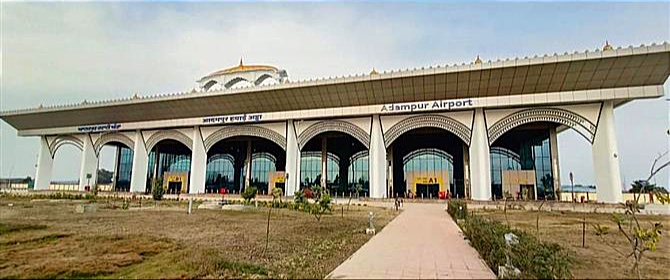
- IATA: AIP; ICAO: VIAX

Summary
- Airport type: Military/public
- Owner: Ministry of Civil Aviation
- Operator: Airports Authority of India, Indian Air Force
- Serves: Jalandhar, Hoshiarpur
- Location: Adampur, Jalandhar district, Punjab, India
- Elevation AMSL: 776 ft (237 m)
- Coordinates: 31°25′59″N 075°45′38″E
- Website: Adampur Airport

Map
- Location of the airport in Punjab AIP (India)

Runways
Direction	Length		Surface
Direction	m	ft	Surface
13/31	2,755	9,039	Asphalt

Statistics (April 2025 - March 2026)
- Passengers: 1,11,287 (▲216%)
- Aircraft movements: 1194 (▲54.7%)
- Cargo tonnage: —
- Source: AAI

Shri Guru Ravidass Maharaj Ji Airport, Adampur (IATA: AIP, ICAO: VIAX), is a domestic airport and an Indian Air Force base serving the cities of Jalandhar and Hoshiarpur in Punjab, India. It is located 6.7 km (4.2 mi) from Adampur town in Jalandhar district, 28 km (17 mi) from Jalandhar and 27 km (17 mi) from Hoshiarpur, and is situated beside National Highway 3 (NH-3). As it lies just between Jalandhar and Hoshiarpur, it serves both cities. The airport was required by the Doaba region of Punjab for facilitating commercial operations, as the other two main airports of the state at Amritsar and Chandigarh are 100 and 145 km distant, respectively.

The airport changed its name to Shri Guru Ravidass Maharaj Ji Airport and was inaugurated by Prime Minister Narendra Modi on 1 February 2026

== History ==
The airport was built around the 1950s. It was made as a base for the Indian Air Force (IAF). The base played a crucial role in the Indo-Pakistani War of 1965. On 6 September 1965, the Pakistan Air Force (PAF) attacked Indian bases at Pathankot, Halwara and Adampur. The attacks on Halwara and Adampur were failures. The strike group turned back before even reaching Adampur.

On the next day (7 September 1965), the PAF parachuted 135 Special Services Group (SSG) para-commandos at the same three Indian airfields (Halwara, Pathankot and Adampur). The daring attempt proved to be an unavoidable impact. Only ten commandos were able to return to Pakistan, while the rest were taken as prisoners of war (including one of the commanders of the operations, Major Khalid Butt). At Adampur, these troops landed in residential areas where the villagers caught, and handed them over to the police.

The Indo-Pakistani War of 1971 on western front started with Operation Chengiz Khan on 3 December 1971. The Pathankot base was hit and the runway was heavily damaged. Pathankot was covered by interceptors from Adampur. Following this first strikez during the time, it took the ground crew to repair its runway.

During the Kargil War, flying from Adampur, the mirages of No. 7 Squadron IAF struck at Tigerhill, Muntho Dhalo and Tololing.

In 2010s, the airport was considered by the Government of Punjab and the Ministry of Civil Aviation to develop the Adampur base into a commercial airport to boost connectivity and socio-economic development of Jalandhar and adjoining regions. In 2017, the Airports Authority of India (AAI) completed the construction of a new passenger terminal and began commercial operations, with daily and weekly flight services to Delhi, Mumbai and Jaipur operated by SpiceJet. However, until the end of 2019, the airline stopped all operations from the airport indefinitely, due to the wake of COVID-19.

In July 2023, SpiceJet and Star Air announced that from November 2023, they will restart regular flight operations from the airport to five destinations–Ghaziabad, Bengaluru, Kolkata, Nanded and Goa, under the UDAN Scheme.

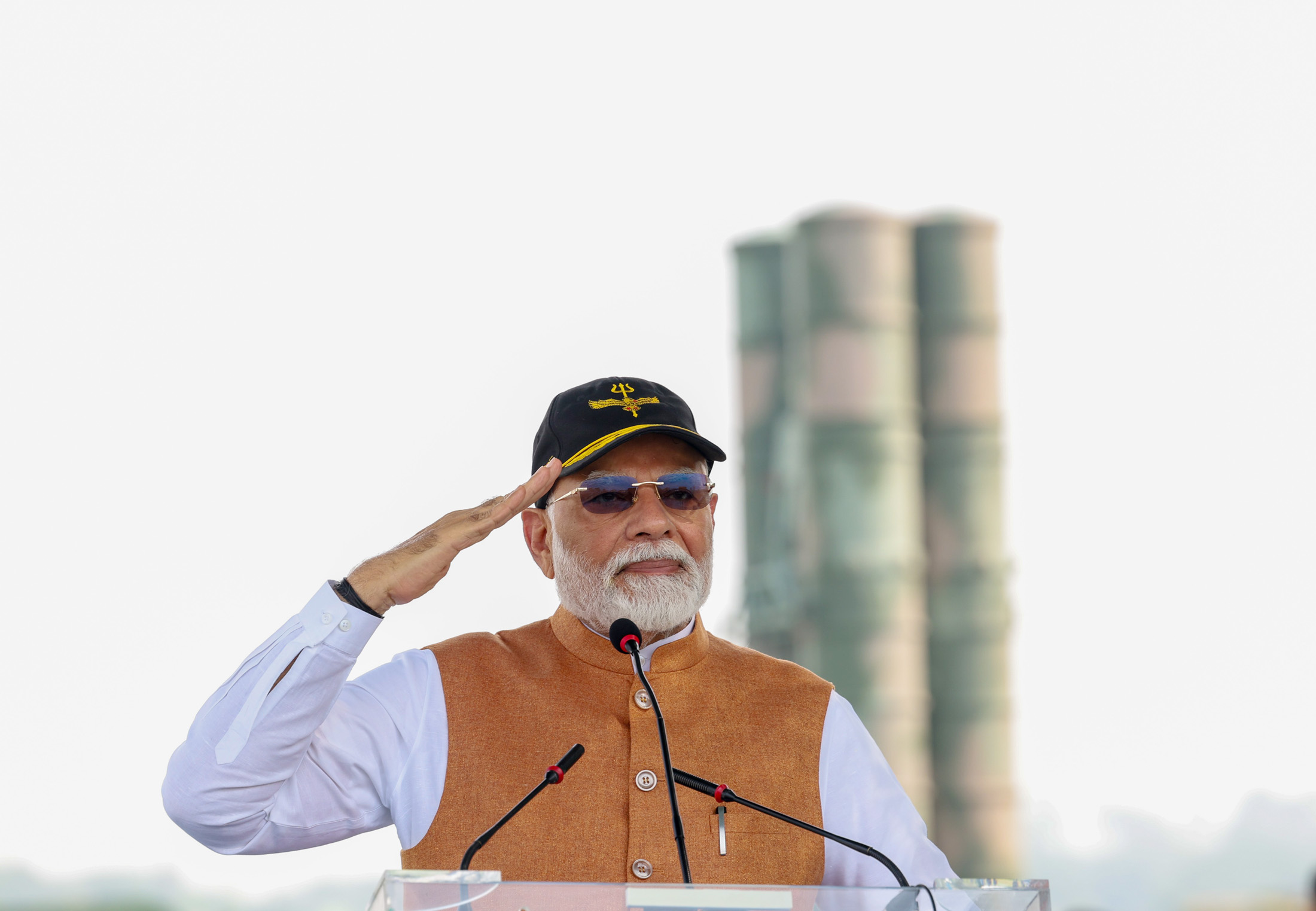
Image of Narendra Modi at the Adampur Air base on 13 May 2025 where the S-400 triumph missile defence system can clearly be seen in the background

On 10 May 2025, during the 2025 India-Pakistan conflict, the Pakistan Armed Forces (PAF) launched drone and missile attacks on the Adampur air base, with JF-17 Thunders reportedly firing CM-400AKG anti-radiation missiles aiming to take out the S-400 Triumf air defense system deployed there. Indian media, citing satellite imagery shortly after the attack and visuals from Prime Minister Narendra Modi's visit to the base on 13 May 2025, refuted Pakistani claims of any damage to the S-400. Pakistani media, which initially claimed that the S-400 was destroyed, later revised their account and claimed that the PAF had instead targeted the 96L6E Cheese Board radar, one of the units of the combined S-400 air defense system.

== Infrastructure ==
The Airports Authority of India (AAI) built a passenger terminal at a cost of ₹ 18 crore at Kandola village of Jalandhar district, adjoining to the air force base to facilitate commercial civil aviation and connectivity, as well as development, in 2017. The Government of India cleared the techno-feasibility report for setting up the passenger terminal in July 2015, after AAI had inspected the proposed site of 50 acres of land, after receiving No Objection Certificate (NOC) from the Indian Air Force. Commercial flights started on 1 May 2018, when SpiceJet began operations under the government's UDAN Scheme. The new terminal covers an area of 75,000 sq.ft. (42 acres). The contract of the new terminal were given to edifice consultants.

== Adampur Air Force Station ==
Adampur Air Force Station, Jalandhar is an airbase of the Indian Air Force, in which the passenger terminal for commercial operations is situated, it is home to No. 47 Squadron IAF which flies the Mikoyan MiG-29UPG as part of Western Air Command.

It is the second largest military airbase of India. It lies within 100 km (62 mi) from the India–Pakistan border.

It also has an underground hangar, which is among Asia's largest, for storage of MiG-29 and Mikoyan-Gurevich MiG-21 interceptors.

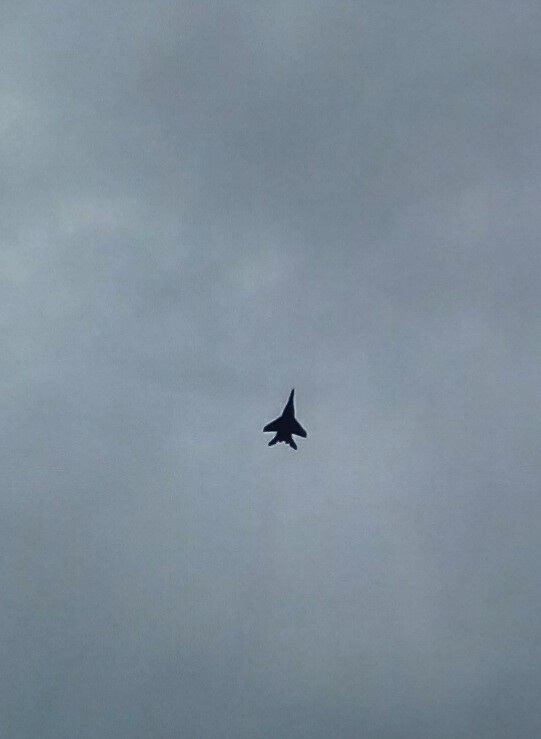
A MiG-29 based at the Air Force station

== Airlines and destinations ==
Airlines	Destinations
Star Air	Ghaziabad, Nanded
IndiGo	Mumbai

== Statistics ==
Operations and statistics
Year	Passengers	Aircraft
2018-19	43,881	660
2019-20	48,670	702
2020-21	13,965	240
2021-22	1,955	52
2022-23	0	0
2023-24	536	14
2024-25	35,220	772
2025-26	1,11,287	1,194

== Connectivity ==
The airport is located close to Adampur town of Jalandhar district, and can be accessed via NH-3 and also from the nearest railway station of Adampur.

== See also ==
- List of Indian Air Force stations
- Western Air Command
- 8-Pass Charlie
