= Mehatpur =

- town
- Country: India
- State: Punjab
- District: Jalandhar

Population
  - Total: 5,804

Languages
  - Official: Punjabi
- Time zone: UTC+5:30 (IST)
- PIN: 144041
- Telephone code: 01821
- Vehicle registration: PB- 33
- Coastline: 0 kilometres (0 mi)
- Nearest city: Nakodar
- Sex ratio: 956/1000 ♂/♀
- Literacy: 78%%
- Lok Sabha constituency: jalandhar
- Climate: hot (Köppen)
- Avg. summer temperature: 45 °C (113 °F)
- Avg. winter temperature: 2 °C (36 °F)

Mehatpur is a village located in Jalandhar district of the Indian state of Punjab. As of the 2011 Census of India, the population was 5,804 people across 1186 households. It is 8 km away from Nakodar on National Highway 71 (NH-71).

== Geography ==
Mehatpur has a humid subtropical climate with cool winters and hot summers. Summers last from April to June, with temperatures varying from average highs of around 45 °C to average lows of around 30 °C and winters from November to February, with temperatures varying from highs of 19 °C to lows of 2 °C. The average annual rainfall is about 60 cm.

== Education ==
The city contains 12 schools offering instruction in English and Punjabi (CBSE & PSEB affiliated). Moreover, school buses are available for students from nearby villages.

== Demographics ==
The primary language of most people in Mehatpur is Punjabi which also is the official language. New languages such as Hindi and English are also commonly spoken, reflecting the increasing cultural diversity of the area. Majority of population belongs to the Sikh religion.

== Religious places ==
—— Religious Places in and around Mehatpur include:

- Baba Ram Malo Ji,
- Sant-Sadhar,
- Gurdwara - Samra Patti,
- Gurudwara Halti Wala Khurampur,
- Gurudwara Ber Sahib shahpur,
- Ramgarhia Mandir,
- Dera Garib Dasi dham,
- Gurudawara Shri Guru Ravidass ji in dhangara patti.
