= Bhogpur =

Bhogpur Bhogpur Sirwal Bhogpur Sirowal
- Town
- Nickname: Bhogpur
- Location in Punjab, India Bhogpur (India)
- Coordinates: 31.55°N 75.63°E
- Country: India
- State: Punjab
- District: Jalandhar

Government
  - Type: Nagar Panchayat
- Elevation: 232 m (761 ft)

Population (2001)
  - Total: 13,893

Languages
  - Official: Punjabi
- Time zone: UTC+5:30 (IST)
- PIN: 144201

Bhogpur is a town and a Nagar Panchayat in Jalandhar district in the state of Punjab, India. Bhogpur has a Dana Mandi and have subsequent villages under it. It also acts as a route from Jalandhar to {Pathankot}.

== History ==
The area around Bhogpur formed part of the northern Jalandhar region where Muslim Bhatti Rajputs had a significant presence. The Gazetteer of the Jalandhar District (Punjab Government Press, 1904) records that Bhatti Rajputs were particularly numerous north of Jullundur Tehsil and near the Kapurthala border, where they possessed villages and substantial areas of cultivated land. Several villages in the present-day Bhogpur area, including Bullowal, Bhattian, Kurala and Rani Bhatti, have names associated with Bhatti settlement, providing historical context for the Bhatti Rajput presence and agricultural landholding in the northern Jalandhar countryside surrounding Bhogpur.

It is also noteworthy that Bhogpur lies very close to the historic Kapurthala region. The tradition of Bhatti Rajput association with the Kapurthala area extends back to the medieval period: Rana Kapur, described as a Bhatti Rajput from Jaisalmer royal family, is credited with founding of Kapurthala in the early 11th century. Taken together, these records, and place names show that the Bhatti Rajputs had a long standing connection with the wider Bhogpur–Kapurthala region.

== Geography ==
Bhogpur is located at 31.55°N 75.63°E.

== Demographics ==
As of 2011 India census, Bhogpur had a population of 17,549. Males constitute 51% (9032) of the population and females 49% (8517). Bhogpur has an average literacy rate of 87.53%, higher than the national average of 59.5%; with male literacy of 79% and female literacy of 70%. Estimated population as of 2025 is approximately 25,500. Census survey of 2021 is not started due to COVID-19 pandemic.

>-Religious Places :- >-Gurudwara Sahib;- 1--- Saheed Guriqbal Singh Samad (Charke) away from 3 kilometer bhogpur (Barsi Samagam:-29dec) 2--- GURUDWARA BABE SAHEED SINGH PATSHAHI-SHEHVI(6VI) SAGRANWALI 3--- BABA BADOANA SAHIB VILL:- DALLI 4--- GURUDWARA BABE SAHEED PATSHAHI SHEHVI (6VI) DALLA 5--- Dera Baba Jahar Peer Ji Laroi (Near Bhogpur) 6--- Dera Baba Jawahar Dass Ji Soosa Away 10-15 kilometer for bhogpur

== Factories ==
--- Samrat Sweet House And Bakers (SP) (EST 1993) Loharan Charke Road (Wholesailer and Retailer) --- Ganesh Sweet Shop G.T Road Bhogpur --- Mohan Sweet Shop (Gt and Adampur Road) --- Chawla Sweet Shop G.T and Adampur Road

=== The Bhogpur Co-operative Sugar Mills Ltd. ===
The plant was installed at the cost of Rs. 98.58 lacs. in the year of 1955-56. It starts its first crushing season in the year 1956-57. The name of the Coop. Sugar Mills was changed from "The Janta Coop. Sugar Mills Ltd. Bhogpur" in the year 1988 with the name of "the Bhogpur Coop. Sugar Mills Ltd. Bhogpur".

== Education ==
The town has around 20 schools.:--- 1--- GURU NANAK GLOBAL SCHOOL LOHARAN (CHARKE), 2--- Government Senior Secondary School girls , 3--- St. Mary's Convent School, Guru Nanak Mission Public School Dalla, St Soilder Divine Public School, DIPS school, Woodbury International School, The Landmark School, S.P.P.S Convent School Bhogpur, Government Senior Secondary School boys, High Dreams School Bhogpur, Kids Zone Pre School, Shri guru harkrishan public senior secondary school and few more.

The nearest university is DAV UNIVERSITY, which is 15 km away from main town. The nearest Medical college is Punjab Institute of Medical Sciences and research, Jalandhar and is around 31 km away from main town.

== Healthcare ==
=== Hospitals ===
KAILASH HOSPITAL, AKAL EYE HOSPITAL,

1. SK SANJEEV MULTISPECILATY HOSPITAL, First Catheterization laboratory (CATH LAB) lab is installed in 2024 in town and used to perform a number of procedures. Hospital is currently providing ICU care, CCU care, Cardiology department, Orthopaedics department, Obstetrics and Gynaecology department, Radiology Department, Orthopedics, Critical Care & Trauma, Pediatrics and Neonatology, General Medicine, General Surgery, Skin (DVL) department, Anaesthesia department.
2. Jap Hospital- ORTHOPAEDIC AND MULTISPECIALITY, JOINT REPLACEMENT.
3. Arora Hospital and Maternity Home and Laparoscopy Center.
4. Sahara Neuropsychiatric and De-addiction Hospital.
5. Dashmesh Hospital.SEHAJ HOSPITAL, JOHAL HOSPITAL

== Transport ==
Local transport in Bhogpur and adjacent villages is by Rickshaws, bus or private vehicles. Due to narrow roads, the auto rickshaws are common like in any other Indian cities.

=== Road ===
Bhogpur is well-connected by road network to all major cities in north India and all major towns and district headquarters within the state. National Highway 44 connects bhogpur to the nearest big city of Jalandhar. It is connected to the capital of Punjab state, Chandigarh by National Highway 344A (India) and is 172 km away.

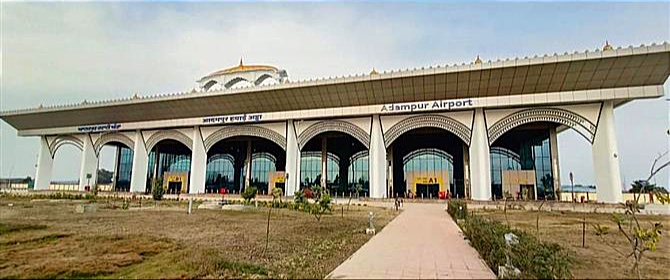
Terminal of Adampur Airport

=== Air ===
Adampur Airport is nearest Domestic Airport situated at Adampur city, 21 kilometres (13 mi) from the town. Regular direct flights to Ghaziabad (Hindon Airport) (distance from delhi airport 40 km) and Nanded (Maharasthra) operate from the airport. Soon there will be direct flights to bangalore, Nanded, Kolkata and Goa will be started as per UDAN scheme. The nearest major International airports are Sri guru Ram Dass Jee International Airport, about 101 km away and Shaheed Bhagat Singh International Airport in Chandigarh about 177 km away.

=== Rail ===
Bhogpur has its own Bhogpur Sirwal Railway Station (BPRS) which is well connected with Pathankot and Jalandhar.
