= Jalandhar district =

District in Punjab, India

- District of Punjab
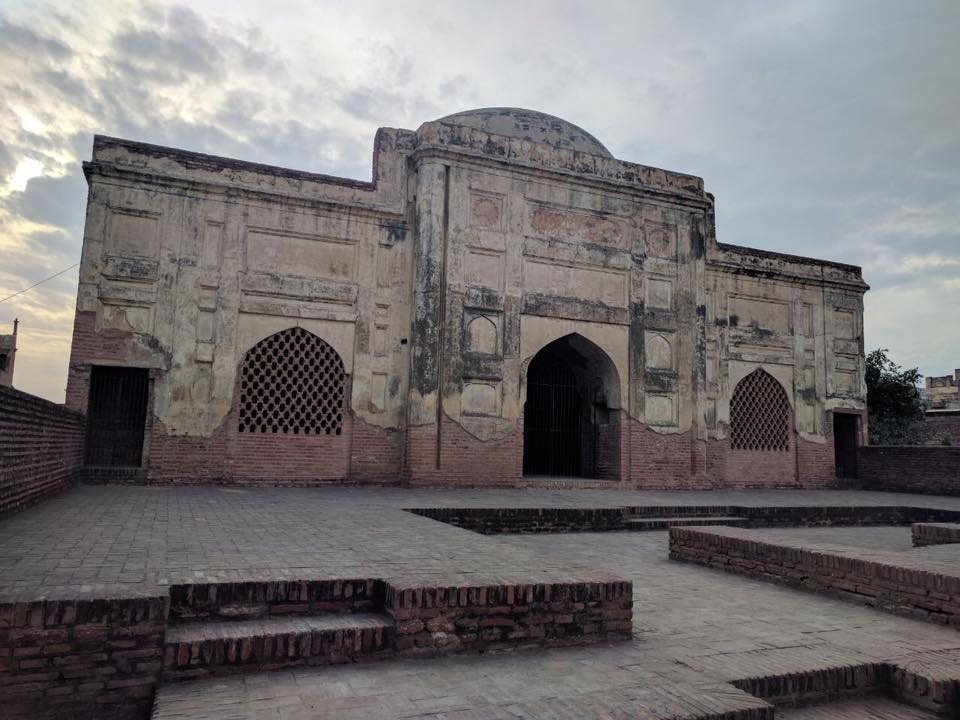
- Serai Nurmahal

- Location in Punjab
- Country: India
- State: Punjab
- Region: Doaba
- Named for: Area inside the water
- Headquarters: Jalandhar

Government
  - Administrator of District: Sh. Varjeet Walia, IAS

Area
  - Total: 2,632 km^{2} (1,016 sq mi)

Population (2011)
  - Total: 2,193,590
  - Density: 833.4/km^{2} (2,159/sq mi)
- Time zone: UTC+5:30 (IST)
- Literacy: 91.4%
- Website: jalandhar.nic.in

Jalandhar district is a district in Doaba region of the state of Punjab, India. The district headquarters is the city of Jalandhar. The district is part of the Jalandhar division.

Before the Partition of India, Jalandhar was also the headquarters of the Jalandhar Division, with constituent districts Jalandhar, Hoshiarpur, Ludhiana, Ferozepur and Kangra. The entire Jalandhar Division was awarded to India when Punjab was partitioned.

== History ==
=== Classical ===
Parmar Rajputs established ancient city of Jalandhar in the 7th century, which is presently known as Jalandhar district. The City consistently had to deter invasion, which were endeavours of invaders.

Jalandhar was the site of the Katoch Rajput kingdom of Jalandhara, also known as Trigartta. The date of its founding is unclear, but its presence is observed by the Chinese pilgrim Xuanzang in the seventh century, and Kalhana records the defeat of Prithvi Chandra Raja of Trigartta by Sankara Varmma of Kashmir towards the end of the ninth century.

=== Medieval ===
Jalandhar became part of the Persianate Ghaznavid Empire during the reign of Ibrahim Shah sometime between 1058 and 1098, and by 1240, it was a fief of the Delhi Sultanate. In 1298, an army led by Ulugh Khan and Zafar Khan defeated in battle, and forced the retreat of invading Mongols of the Chagatai Khanate.

The sack and plunder of Delhi by Timur in 1398 gravely weakened the Delhi Sultanate and ushered in a period of lawlessness in the country. In 1416, the governor of Jalandhar, Malik Tughan assassinated the governor of Sirhind, and later rebelled against Khizr Khan, before being defeated. In the following years Jasrath Khokhar led a series of raids across Jalandhar as he challenged the authority of the Sultan. In 1441, Jalandhar came under the authority of Bahlol Lodi who was appointed governor of Lahore province. Lodi made peace with Jasrath, rebelled and in 1450 became sovereign of Delhi.

=== Early modern ===
==== Mughal ====
When Babur invaded northern India in 1524 he granted the jagir of Jalandhar to Daulat Khan Lodi at whose instigation he had come. The following year Lodi revolted and was defeated by Babur. In 1540, Babur's son Humayun was expelled by Sher Shah Suri and Jalandhar became part of the Sur Empire. On Humayun's return in 1555, Jalandhar was occupied by his general Bairam Khan and later Akbar. While Akbar had moved east to fight Hemu, Sikandar Suri defeated Khizr Khan, governor of Lahore, at Chamiari in the north of the district. On Akbar's return to Jalandhar, Mughal hegemony was re-established.

With the regaining of Humayun, Muslim tribes such as Baloch, Syed and Arain who were settled in Sindh and Balochistan migrated to the Jalandhar Doaba region.

During Akbar's reign, the city of Jalandhar became one of his mint cities. In 1594, the town of Kartarpur was founded by Guru Arjan on land granted by Akbar. The reigns of Jahangir and Shah Jahan saw significant improvements to the region's infrastructure, and many villages were founded. The town of Phillaur dates from this period, when it was selected for one of the serais on the Delhi to Lahore road, while the town of Nurmahal was re-established by Jahangir's consort Nur Jahan, who is believed to have been raised there. Mughal administrative authority in Jalandhar lasted into the reign of Muhammad Shah, evidenced by the significant number of land grants in the district issued by the Emperor.

==== Durrani ====
Nader Shah's invasion of India, culminating in the sack of Delhi in 1739, effectively ended Mughal imperial power. During his fourth invasion, Nurmahal was plundered and its inhabitants slaughtered. In 1756, Adina Beg, Arain settled in Jalandhar, assisted militarily by Jassa Singh Ramgarhia, defeated Sarbuland Khan, the Afghan general and captured Jalandhar. In 1758, the Mahrattas, at the instigation of Adina Beg, invaded the Punjab, defeating the Afghans, and installing Adina Beg as governor of the entire province. Adina Beg died in 1759, and in 1761 the Afghans returned, taking control of the Punjab, and driving out the Mahrattas.

==== Sikh ====
The death of Adina Beg coincided with the start of increasing Sikh influence in Jalandhar, with many sardars dating the acquisition of their estates from 1759. The Dallewalia Misl, one of twelve Sikh Misls that came to dominate the Punjab during this period originated in the southern extremities of the district. In 1766 the Faizullapuria Misl of Khushal Singh captured the town of Jalandhar and thereafter entrenched their power in the district.

In 1811, Ranjit Singh despatched Dewan Mokham Chand to annexe Faizullapuria dominions in Jalandhar. By August that year, Budh Singh, son of Khushal Singh, had fled and Jalandhar came under the control of Lahore and part of the Sikh Empire. The petty sardars of the district were gradually ousted from their estates, and were replaced by the direct management of the Sikh governors.

=== Modern ===
==== British ====
During both the First Anglo-Sikh War and Second Anglo-Sikh War no significant battle took place in Jalandhar. Following the British victory in 1846, Jalandhar was ceded to the East India Company becoming part of the Trans Sutlej States.

When the Indian Rebellion of 1857 began, Jalandhar was strategically important as a main line of communication between the Punjab and Delhi. Incidents of mutiny originated in Jalandhar and Phillaur cantonments, however they were suppressed by the 8th Foot who in turn were strengthened by troops provided by Randhir Singh of Kapurthala, John Nicholson's moveable column and the Tiwana horse under Sher Muhammad Khan.

In 1858, Jalandhar became part of the British Raj and in 1863 became administratively part of Punjab province.

The first case of the plague in the Punjab was reported in the village of Khatkar Kalan in 1897.

==== Partition ====
In early 1947, communal tensions heightened in Jalandhar and across the Punjab. In March riots occurred in the district following speeches made by Congress and Sikh leaders at Lahore. In June 1947, the Indian Independence Act 1947 stipulated the partition of the Punjab, and on 17 August the Radcliffe Line was announced, placing Jalandhar in the new Dominion of India. As Jalandhar had a Muslim plurality at the time (45.23 per cent per the 1941 census) it led to significant demographic change in the district, with the Muslim population becoming refugees in Pakistan, and an influx of Hindus and Sikhs arriving having abandoned their homes in the new Pakistan.

== Administration ==
The district is divided into five tehsils:

- Jalandhar-I, Jalandhar-II, Nakodar, Phillaur, and Shahkot

In addition there are a further five sub-tehsils:

- Adampur, Bhogpur, Goraya, Kartarpur, and Nurmahal

=== Subdistricts of Jalandhar district ===
According to the Indian government's integrated online directory, Gurdaspur district is divided into the following subdistricts (tehsils/subdivisions) and blocks:

- Subdistricts
  1. Adampur
  2. Jalandhar - I
  3. Jalandhar - II
  4. Nakodar
  5. Phillaur
  6. Shahkot
- Blocks:
  1. Adampur
  2. Bhogpur
  3. Jalandhar - West
  4. Jalandhar-East
  5. Lohian
  6. Mehatpur
  7. Nakodar
  8. Nurmahal
  9. Phillaur
  10. Rurka Kalan
  11. Shahkot

== Constituencies ==
Jalandhar Lok Sabha constituency is one of the 13 Lok Sabha constituencies in Punjab.

There are also nine Punjab Vidhan Sabha constituencies located in the district:

- Adampur, Jalandhar Cantt, Jalandhar Central, Jalandhar North, Jalandhar West, Kartarpur, Nakodar, Phillaur, and Shahkot

=== MLA ===
No.	Constituency	Name of MLA	Party	Bench
30	Phillaur (SC)	Vikramjit Singh Chaudhary	Indian National Congress	Opposition
31	Nakodar	Inderjit Kaur Mann	Aam Aadmi Party	Government
32	Shahkot	Hardev Singh Laddi	Indian National Congress	Opposition
33	Kartarpur (SC)	Balkar Singh	Aam Aadmi Party	Government
34	Jalandhar West (SC)	Mohinder Bhagat	Aam Aadmi Party	Government
35	Jalandhar Central	Raman Arora	Aam Aadmi Party	Government
36	Jalandhar North	Avtar Singh Junior	Indian National Congress	Opposition
37	Jalandhar Cantonment	Pargat Singh	Indian National Congress	Opposition
38	Adampur (SC)	Sukhwinder Singh Kotli	Indian National Congress	Opposition

== Villages ==
- Abadan, Jalandhar
- Achan Chak
- Adagil
- Addhi Khuyi
- Ade Kali
- Adhi, Jalandhar
- Adraman
- Aemakazi
- Aidalpur
- Ajtani
- Akalpur
- Akbarpur Kalan
- Akbarpur Khurd
- Akhara, Bhogpur
- Akuwal
- Aladinpur
- Alamgir, Bhogpur
- Alampur, Jalandhar
- Alewali
- Ali Chak
- Ali Khel, Jalandhar
- Alipur-1
- Alipur-2
- Aliwal, Jalandhar
- Allowal
- Ambgarh
- Ambia Tohva
- Angi Kiri
- Anihar
- Apra, Punjab
- Arjanwal
- Ashahoor
- Ashaur
- Athola
- Atta, Jalandhar
- Atti, Jalandhar
- Aujla
- Aujla Dhak
- Aulakh, Nakodar
- Awan Chaharmi
- Awan Khalsa
- Baloki
- Behram Sarishta
- Chachowal
- Chananpur
- Chandpur
- Chuhan
- Chukhiara
- Damudarpur
- Dhandaur
- Dhandauri
- Dhandwar
- Dhepur
- Diwali
- Ghurial
- Goalpind
- Hardo Pharala
- Hazara
- Isharwal
- Jago Sangha
- Jalbhe
- Kandola
- Kandola Khurd
- Kapur Pind
- Kathar
- Khojpur
- Kot Kalan
- Kotli Jamiat Singh
- Kotli Sheikhan
- Lesariwala
- Mander
- Mianwal Araian
- Nagra
- Nawan Qila
- Partappura
- Sagarpur
- Salaich
- Sanoura
- Sarnana
- Satowali
- Sattowali
- Sitalpur
- Sundar Tatar

== Demographics ==
Historical population
Year	Pop.	±% p.a.
1901	721,579	—
1911	630,769	−1.34%
1921	647,086	+0.26%
1931	742,659	+1.39%
1941	887,080	+1.79%
1951	829,858	−0.66%
1961	981,801	+1.70%
1971	1,175,196	+1.81%
1981	1,406,587	+1.81%
1991	1,649,937	+1.61%
2001	1,962,761	+1.75%
2011	2,193,590	+1.12%

According to the 2011 census Jalandhar district has a population of 21,93,590 roughly equal to the nation of Latvia or the US state of New Mexico. This gives it a ranking of 208th in India (out of a total of 640). The district has a population density of 831 inhabitants per square kilometre (2,150/sq mi) . Its population growth rate over the decade 2001-2011 was 11.16%. Jalandhar has a sex ratio of 913 females for every 1000 males, and a literacy rate of 91.4%. Scheduled Castes made up 38.95% of the population.

=== Gender ===
The table below shows the sex ratio of Jalandhar district through decades.

Sex ratio of Jalandhar district
Census year	Ratio
2011	915
2001	887
1991	897
1981	890
1971	883
1961	867
1951	857
1941	859
1931	841
1921	807
1911	783
1901	848

The table below shows the child sex ratio of children below the age of 6 years in the rural and urban areas of Jalandhar district.

Child sex ratio of children below the age of 6 years in Jalandhar district
Year	Urban	Rural
2011	865	885
2001	793	817

=== Religion ===
Religion in Jalandhar district (2011)
Religion	Percent
Hinduism	63.56%
Sikhism	32.75%
Islam	1.38%
Christianity	1.19%
Buddhism	0.52%
Other or not stated	0.22%

Hinduism is the majority religion. In rural areas, Hindus and Sikhs are in roughly equal proportions, but in urban areas, Hindus are predominant.

Religion in Jalandhar District
Religious group	2011	
Religious group	Pop.	%
Hinduism	1,394,329	63.56%
Sikhism	718,363	32.75%
Islam	30,233	1.38%
Christianity	26,016	1.19%
Others	24,649	1.12%
Total Population	2,193,590	100%

The table below shows the population of different religions in absolute numbers in the urban and rural areas of Jalandhar district.

Absolute numbers of different religious groups in Jalandhar district
Religion	Urban (2011)	Rural (2011)	Urban (2001)	Rural (2001)	Urban (1991)	Rural (1991)
Hindu	8,63,936	5,30,393	6,72,889	4,85,979	4,60,102	5,09,318
Sikh	2,52,274	4,66,089	2,30,709	5,10,132	1,42,700	6,00,666
Muslim	14,363	12,408	9,835	9,092	4,452	4,048
Christian	17,825	11,653	8,216	12,271	1,381	7,231
Other religions	14,363	11,876	9,835	13,243	4,452	720

Religion in tehsils of Jalandhar district (2011)
Tehsil	Hinduism (%)	Sikhism (%)	Islam (%)	Christianity (%)	Others (%)
Shahkot	31.84	66.51	0.52	0.84	0.29
Nakodar	52.71	44.07	1.27	1.10	0.85
Phillaur	61.86	34.17	1.39	0.43	2.15
Jalandhar - I	72.66	23.34	1.50	1.36	1.14
Jalandhar - II	55.91	40.48	1.43	1.74	0.44

Religious groups in Jalandhar District (British Punjab province era)
Religious group	1881		1891		1901		1911		1921		1931		1941	
Religious group	Pop.	%	Pop.	%	Pop.	%	Pop.	%	Pop.	%	Pop.	%	Pop.	%
Islam	358,601	45.42%	413,469	45.56%	421,011	45.88%	357,051	44.52%	366,586	44.57%	419,556	44.46%	509,804	45.23%
Hinduism (Note: 1931-1941: Including Ad-Dharmis)	338,292	42.85%	380,916	41.97%	368,051	40.11%	265,378	33.09%	244,995	29.79%	268,822	28.49%	311,010	27.59%
Sikhism	90,320	11.44%	110,790	12.21%	125,817	13.71%	176,227	21.98%	206,130	25.06%	249,571	26.45%	298,741	26.5%
Christianity	1,631	0.21%	1,645	0.18%	1,713	0.19%	2,404	0.3%	4,088	0.5%	4,323	0.46%	6,233	0.55%
Jainism	690	0.09%	760	0.08%	969	0.11%	842	0.1%	736	0.09%	1,379	0.15%	1,395	0.12%
Zoroastrianism	2	0%	3	0%	24	0%	18	0%	9	0%	70	0.01%	7	0%
Buddhism	0	0%	0	0%	0	0%	0	0%	0	0%	0	0%	0	0%
Judaism	—N/a	—N/a	0	0%	2	0%	0	0%	0	0%	0	0%	0	0%
Others	19	0%	0	0%	0	0%	0	0%	0	0%	0	0%	0	0%
Total population	789,555	100%	907,583	100%	917,587	100%	801,920	100%	822,544	100%	943,721	100%	1,127,190	100%
Note: British Punjab province era district borders are not an exact match in the present-day due to various bifurcations to district borders — which since created new districts — throughout the historic Punjab Province region during the post-independence era that have taken into account population increases.

Religion in the Tehsils of Jalandhar District (1921)
Tehsil	Hinduism		Islam		Sikhism		Christianity		Jainism		Others (Note: Including Buddhism, Zoroastrianism, Judaism, Tribals, others, or not stated)		Total	
Tehsil	Pop.	%	Pop.	%	Pop.	%	Pop.	%	Pop.	%	Pop.	%	Pop.	%
Jalandhar Tehsil	77,101	26.64%	142,435	49.22%	66,119	22.85%	3,255	1.12%	477	0.16%	9	0%	289,396	100%
Nawanshahr Tehsil	72,500	40.8%	56,258	31.66%	48,620	27.36%	112	0.06%	202	0.11%	0	0%	177,692	100%
Phillaur Tehsil	58,401	35.44%	55,408	33.62%	50,787	30.82%	201	0.12%	9	0.01%	0	0%	164,806	100%
Nakodar Tehsil	36,993	19.4%	112,485	59%	40,604	21.3%	520	0.27%	48	0.03%	0	0%	190,650	100%
Note: British Punjab province era tehsil borders are not an exact match in the present-day due to various bifurcations to tehsil borders — which since created new tehsils — throughout the historic Punjab Province region during the post-independence era that have taken into account population increases.

Religion in the Tehsils of Jalandhar District (1941)
Tehsil	Hinduism		Islam		Sikhism		Christianity		Jainism		Others (Note: Including Anglo-Indian Christians, British Christians, Buddhism, Zoroastrianism, Judaism, Tribals, others, or not stated)		Total	
Tehsil	Pop.	%	Pop.	%	Pop.	%	Pop.	%	Pop.	%	Pop.	%	Pop.	%
Jalandhar Tehsil	123,718	27.93%	226,623	51.16%	86,996	19.64%	4,656	1.05%	768	0.17%	249	0.06%	443,010	100%
Nawanshahr Tehsil	81,019	34.33%	74,449	31.54%	79,972	33.88%	92	0.04%	496	0.21%	0	0%	236,028	100%
Phillaur Tehsil	66,507	30.32%	72,814	33.19%	79,736	36.35%	294	0.13%	7	0%	11	0.01%	219,369	100%
Nakodar Tehsil	39,766	17.38%	135,918	59.41%	52,037	22.75%	929	0.41%	124	0.05%	9	0%	228,783	100%
Note1: British Punjab province era tehsil borders are not an exact match in the present-day due to various bifurcations to tehsil borders — which since created new tehsils — throughout the historic Punjab Province region during the post-independence era that have taken into account population increases. Note2: Tehsil religious breakdown figures for Christianity only includes local Christians, labelled as "Indian Christians" on census. Does not include Anglo-Indian Christians or British Christians, who were classified under "Other" category.

=== Language ===
Languages of Jalandhar district (2011)
1. Punjabi (88.2%)
2. Hindi (9.83%)
3. Others (2.02%)

At the time of the 2011 census, 88.15% of the population spoke Punjabi and 9.83% Hindi as their first language. Hindi is predominantly spoken in urban areas.

== Health ==
The table below shows the data from the district nutrition profile of children below the age of 5 years, in Jalandhar, as of year 2020.

District nutrition profile of children under 5 years of age in Jalandhar, year 2020
Indicators	Number of children (<5 years)	Percent (2020)	Percent (2016)
Stunted	38,536	25%	29%
Wasted	15,967	10%	17%
Severely wasted	6,834	4%	6%
Underweight	25,877	17%	25%
Overweight/obesity	2,827	2%	1%
Anemia	96,595	69%	60%
Total children	155,323		

The table below shows the district nutrition profile of Jalandhar of women between the ages of 15 and 49 years, as of year 2020.

District nutritional profile of Jalandhar of women of 15–49 years, in 2020
Indicators	Number of women (15–49 years)	Percent (2020)	Percent (2016)
Underweight (BMI <18.5 kg/m^2)	85,534	12%	7%
Overweight/obesity	347,827	48%	27%
Hypertension	234,262	33%	12%
Diabetes	128,120	18%	NA
Anemia (non-preg)	412,752	57%	54%
Anemia (preg)	NA	NA	49%
Total women (preg)	35,199		
Total women	720,586		

The table below shows the number of road accidents and people affected in Jalandhar district by year.

Road accidents and people affected in Jalandhar district by year
Year	Accidents	Killed	Injured	Vehicles Involved
2022	273	197	127	456
2021	354	306	127	415
2020	317	223	155	381
2019	380	322	163	463

== Economy ==
Jalandhar has a major sports items manufacturing industry. It produces around 90% of all sports items produced in Punjab.

== Notable people ==
- Hoon Balakram, a mathematician, civil servant and Bombay High Court judge
- Prakash Chandra Sood, a nuclear physicist and professor and receiver of Padam Shri
- Harminder Dua, an Indian-British medical doctor and prominent researcher in the field of ophthalmology, known for discovery of a previously unknown layer of the human cornea now called Dua's layer
- Guru Prakash Dutta, a cell biologist and immunologist, known for his contributions to experimental protozoology and immunology
- Satya Paul Agarwal, an neurosurgeon, academician, public health administrator, secretary general of the Indian Red Cross Society and recipient of Padam Bhushan award
- Satinder Singh, a 400-meter hurdle athlete
- Fauja Singh, a British marathon runner
- Davinder Singh Kang, a javelin throw athlete
- Diljit Dosanjh, a singer and actor
- Achal Kumar Jyoti, a retired IAS officer who served as 21st Chief Election Commissioner of India from 6 July 2017 to 23 January 2018
- Dilbagh Singh, the head of the Indian Air Force from 1981 to 1984, as Chief of the Air Staff
- Malkiat Singh (IPS) - Former DGP and Chairman UPPSC
- Iqbal Preet Singh Sahota - Former DGP Punjab Police
- Sukhjeet Singh - Indian field hockey player
- Harbhajan Singh - Indian Cricket Player
