= List of villages in Nakodar tehsil =

As of the 2011 Census of India, there are 147 villages under Nakodar tehsil, a subdivision of Jalandhar district, in Punjab, India.

Villages	Population
Addi	1,474
Adraman	2,331
Akbarpur Kalan	939
Akbarpur Khurd	266
Alewali	603
Allowal	752
Angi Kiri	820
Aulak	955
Awan Chaharmi	491
Awan Khalsa	674
Baghela	1,822
Bagpur	259
Bajuha Kalan	1,480
Bajuha Khurd	2,096
Bal Hukmi	513
Bal Kohna	751
Baloki	1,176
Bangiwal	817
Bara Aslam	412
Bara Sidhpur	399
Bath	2,416
Baupur	153
Behar	776
Bhodipur	529
Bhullar	901
Bila Nawab	716
Bir Baloki	1,423
Bir Pind	1,615
Bir Udhowal	175
Bitlan	696
Boparai	3,507
Budhi Pind	263
Bulanda	1,014
Chak Kalan	2,283
Chak Khurd	1,176
Chak Muglani	1,153
Chak Pirpur	267
Chak Vendal	1,693
Chak Vendhal	1,281
Chanian	2,164
Chhaula	313
Chuhar	1,231
Dhadda Dilkhapur	296
Dhadda Haripur	219
Dhadda Hundal	286
Dhadda Lehna	290
Dhaliwal	3,121
Dherian	1,242
Dhuggar	188
Durgawal	420
Fazalpur	544
Gandhran	2,039
Gaunsuwal	1,040
Gill	1,411
Gohir	1,888
Gura	855
Haer	2,213
Haripur	1,744
Husainabad	764
Hussainpur	654
Jahangir	652
Jamaitgarh Alias Khosa	193
Jawinde	74
Jhungian	992
Kang Sahbu	2,694
Kang Sahibrai	1,260
Kangna	2,199
Khaira Mushtarka	775
Khairulapur	999
Khanpur Dhadda	1,612
Khiwa	1,419
Khurampur	2,776
Khursheidpur	1,004
Kotla Bhagu	495
Kotla Jangan	898
Kotla Sudan	78
Ladhewali	349
Ladhran	1,218
Leel	20
Littran	1,815
Lohar Nangal	95
Lohgarh	1,095
Maheru	1,740
Mahunwal	1,564
Mallian Kalan	1,105
Mallian Khurd	1,394
Malri	2,469
Malwal	743
Mandiala	1,538
Mehatpur	5,804
Mehmudpur	237
Mehsampur	1,287
Miranpur	785
Mirpur	661
Muhem	1,739
Mundh	2,068
Musewal	342
Muzaffarpur	365
Nakodar (Rural)	481
Nangal Jiwan	486
Nawan Pind Araian	1,346
Nawan Pind Dakhni	1,353
Nurpur	1,993
Pandori Khas	2,043
Pandori Sheikhan	125
Panjgrain	24
Pasarian	537
Pindori Rajputan	506
Qaimwala	979
Rahimpur	1,690
Raibwal	541
Raipur Araian	1,382
Raipur Gujran	596
Ramunwal	752
Rangra	434
Rasulpur (029926)	659
Rasulpur (029991)	961
Rasulpur Kalan	1,733
Rauli	967
Saham	796
Sahariwal	599
Saidupur	464
Samailpur	1,362
Sangowal	2,591
Sarai Kham	417
Sarih	3,417
Sehowal	545
Shah Salempur	859
Shahpur (029973)	963
Shahpur (029872)	166
Shankar	5,639
Sharakpur	1,587
Sianiwal	872
Sidhwan	1,724
Singhpur, Jalandhar	1,035
Singhpur (029883)	585
Sohal Khurd	837
Tahli, Nakodar	1,889
Talwandi Bharo	2,303
Talwandi Salem	1,222
Tandaura	1,013
Thabalke	1,539
Tut	1,549
Udhowal	1,339
Uggi	4,117
Ummarwal Billa	2,422
Umrewal	484
