= Talwandi Butian =

- Village
- Location in Punjab, India Talwandi Butian (India)
- Coordinates: 31.0785443°N 75.2688602°E
- Country: India
- State: Punjab
- District: Jalandhar
- Tehsil: Nakodar

Government
  - Type: Panchayat raj
  - Body: Gram panchayat
- Elevation: 240 m (790 ft)

Population (2011)
  - Total: 2,889
- Sex ratio 1480/1409 ♂/♀

Languages
  - Official: Punjabi
- Time zone: UTC+5:30 (IST)
- ISO 3166 code: IN-PB
- Vehicle registration: PB- 08
- Website: jalandhar.nic.in

Talwandi Butian is a village in Nakodar in Jalandhar district of Punjab State, India. It is located 7 kilometres (4.3 mi) from Nakodar, 25 kilometres (16 mi) from Kapurthala, 49 kilometres (30 mi) from district headquarter Jalandhar and 180 kilometres (110 mi) from state capital Chandigarh. The village is administrated by a sarpanch who is an elected representative of village as per Panchayati raj (India).

== Demography ==
As of 2011, the village has a total number of 535 houses and a population of 2889 of which include 1480 are males while 1409 are females according to the report published by Census India in 2011. The literacy rate of the village is 66.80, lower than state average of 75.84%. The population of children under the age of 6 years is 353 which is 12.22% of total population of the village, and child sex ratio is approximately 1040 higher than the state average of 846.

Most of the people are from Schedule Caste which consist Talwandi Butianes 69.12% of total population in the village. The town does not have any Schedule Tribe population so far.

As per census 2011, 951 people were engaged in work activities out of the total population of the village which includes 784 males and 167 females. According to census survey report 2011, 97.79% workers describe their work as main work and 2.21% workers are involved in marginal activity providing livelihood for less than 6 months.

== Transport ==
Nakodar railway station is the nearest train station. The village is 86 kilometres (53 mi) away from domestic airport in Ludhiana and the nearest international airport is located in Chandigarh also Sri Guru Ram Dass Jee International Airport is the second nearest airport which is 108 kilometres (67 mi) away in Amritsar.

== See also ==
- List of villages in India
