= Maheem =

- Village
- Interactive map of Maheem
- Coordinates: 31°08′34″N 75°28′37″E
- Country: India
- State: Punjab
- District: Jalandhar

Languages
  - Official: Punjabi
- Time zone: UTC+5:30 (IST)
- PIN: 144044
- Telephone code: 1821
- Vehicle registration: PB- 08

Maheem commonly pronounced as Mahem (महेम्) is a village in Nakodar. Nakodar is a tehsil in the city Jalandhar of Indian state of Punjab.
