= Talwandi Sanghra =

Talwandi Sanghera Panjabi: Talavaṇḍī saṅgahirā
- Village
- Interactive map of Talwandi Sanghera
- Coordinates: 31.0759691°N 75.3985046°E

Government
  - Type: Panchayat raj
  - Body: Gram panchayat
- Elevation: 240 m (790 ft)

Population (2011)
  - Total: 1,455
- Sex ratio 727/728 ♂/♀

Languages
  - Official: Punjabi
- Vehicle registration: PB- 08

Talwandi Sanghera (Panjabi: Talavaṇḍī saṅgahirā) is a village in Nakodar in Jalandhar district of Punjab. It is located 6.7 kilometres (4.2 mi) from Nakodar, 10 kilometres (6.2 mi) from Kapurthala, 36 kilometres (22 mi) from district headquarter Jalandhar and 164 kilometres (102 mi) from state capital Chandigarh.

== Demography ==
As of 2011, the village has a total number of 291 houses and a population of 1455 of which include 727 are males while 728 are females according to the report published by Census India in 2011. The literacy rate of the village is 83.90%, higher than state average of 80.36%. The population of children under the age of 6 years is 136 which is 9.35% of total population of the village, and child sex ratio is approximately 1125 lower than the state average of 846.

Most of the people are from Schedule Caste which constitutes 18.76% of total population in the village. The town does not have any Schedule Tribe population so far.

As per census 2011, 1014 people were engaged in work activities out of the total population of the village which includes 521 males and 493 females. According to census survey report 2011, 33.23% workers describe their work as main work and 66.77% workers are involved in marginal activity providing livelihood for less than 6 months.

== Transport ==
Nakodar railway station is the nearest train station. The village is 70 kilometres (43 mi) away from domestic airport in Ludhiana and the nearest international airport is located in Chandigarh also Sri Guru Ram Dass Jee International Airport is the second nearest airport which is 115 kilometres (71 mi) away in Amritsar.
