= Chak Muglani =

- Village
- Location in Punjab, India Chak Muglani (India)
- Coordinates: 31°08′13.36″N 75°30′39.05″E
- Country: India
- State: Punjab
- District: Jalandhar
- Tehsil: Nakodar

Government
  - Type: Panchayat raj
  - Body: Gram panchayat

Area
  - Total: 47 ha (120 acres)

Population (2011)
  - Total: 1,153; 584/569 ♂/♀
  - Scheduled Castes: 822; 412/410 ♂/♀
  - Total Households: 238

Languages
  - Official: Punjabi
- Time zone: UTC+5:30 (IST)
- ISO 3166 code: IN-PB
- Website: jalandhar.gov.in

Chak Muglani is a village in Nakodar in Jalandhar district of Punjab State, India. It is located 3 kilometres (1.9 mi) from sub district headquarter and 28 kilometres (17 mi) from district headquarter. The village is administrated by Sarpanch an elected representative of the village.

== Demography ==
As of 2011, The village has a total number of 238 houses and the population of 1153 of which 584 are males while 569 are females. According to the report published by Census India in 2011, out of the total population of the village 822 people are from Schedule Caste and the village does not have any Schedule Tribe population so far.

== See also ==
- List of villages in India
