= Uggi, Jalandhar =

Uggi
- Village
- Location in Punjab, India Uggi (India)
- Coordinates: 31.2143612°N 75.428127°E
- Country: India
- State: Punjab
- District: Jalandhar
- Tehsil: Nakodar

Government
  - Type: Panchayat raj
  - Body: Gram panchayat
- Elevation: 240 m (790 ft)

Population (2011)
  - Total: 4,117
- Sex ratio 2117/2000 ♂/♀

Languages
  - Official: Punjabi
- Time zone: UTC+5:30 (IST)
- ISO 3166 code: IN-PB
- Vehicle registration: PB- 08
- Website: jalandhar.nic.in

Uggi is a village in Nakodar in Jalandhar district of Punjab State, India. It is located 15 kilometres (9.3 mi) from Nakodar, 22.7 kilometres (14.1 mi) from Kapurthala, 23 kilometres (14 mi) from district headquarter Jalandhar and 169 kilometres (105 mi) from state capital Chandigarh. The village is administrated by a sarpanch who is an elected representative of village as per Panchayati raj (India).

== Demography ==
As of 2011, The village has a total number of 824 houses and population of 4117 of which include 2117 are males while 2000 are females according to the report published by Census India in 2011. Literacy rate of the village is 73.98%, lower than state average of 75.84%. The population of children under the age of 6 years is 474 which is 11.51% of total population of the village, and child sex ratio is approximately 945 higher than the state average of 846.

Most of the people are from Schedule Caste which constitutes 57% of total population in the village. The town does not have any Schedule Tribe population so far.

As per census 2011, 1406 people were engaged in work activities out of the total population of the village which includes 1221 males and 185 females. According to census survey report 2011, 82.1% workers describe their work as main work and 17.99% workers are involved in marginal activity providing livelihood for less than 6 months.

== Transport ==
Nakodar railway station is the nearest train station. The village is 76 kilometres (47 mi) away from domestic airport in Ludhiana and the nearest international airport is located in Chandigarh also Sri Guru Ram Dass Jee International Airport is the second nearest airport which is 103 kilometres (64 mi) away in Amritsar.
