= Pindori Rajputan =

- Village
- Location in Punjab, India Pindori Rajputan (India)
- Coordinates: 31.209138°N 75.5923652°E
- Country: India
- State: Punjab
- District: Jalandhar
- Tehsil: Nakodar

Government
  - Type: Panchayat raj
  - Body: Gram panchayat
- Elevation: 240 m (790 ft)

Population (2011)
  - Total: 506
- Sex ratio 267/239 ♂/♀

Languages
  - Official: Punjabi
- Time zone: UTC+5:30 (IST)
- ISO 3166 code: IN-PB
- Vehicle registration: PB- 08
- Website: jalandhar.nic.in

Pindori Rajputan is a village in Nakodar in Jalandhar district of Punjab State, India. It is located 25 kilometres (16 mi) from Nakodar, 33 kilometres (21 mi) from Kapurthala, 42 kilometres (26 mi) from district headquarter Jalandhar and 180 kilometres (110 mi) from state capital Chandigarh. The village is administrated by a sarpanch who is an elected representative of village as per Panchayati raj (India).

== Transport ==
Nakodar railway station is the nearest train station. The village is 87 kilometres (54 mi) away from domestic airport in Ludhiana and the nearest international airport is located in Chandigarh also Sri Guru Ram Dass Jee International Airport is the second nearest airport which is 113 kilometres (70 mi) away in Amritsar.
