= Kangna (village) =

- Village
- Location in Punjab, India Kangna (India)
- Coordinates: 31.1405236°N 75.379293°E
- Country: India
- State: Punjab
- District: Jalandhar
- Tehsil: Nakodar

Government
  - Type: Panchayat raj
  - Body: Gram panchayat
- Elevation: 240 m (790 ft)

Population (2011)
  - Total: 2,199
- Sex ratio 1110/1089 ♂/♀

Languages
  - Official: Punjabi
- Time zone: UTC+5:30 (IST)
- PIN: 144040
- Telephone: 01821
- ISO 3166 code: IN-PB
- Vehicle registration: PB- 08
- Website: jalandhar.nic.in

Kangna is a village in Nakodar in Jalandhar district of Punjab State, India. It is located 11.7 km from Nakodar, 33.5 km from Kapurthala, 35.3 km from the district headquarters Jalandhar and 167 km from the state capital Chandigarh. The village is administered by a sarpanch who is an elected representative of the village as per Panchayati raj (India).

== Transport ==
Nakodar railway station is the nearest train station. The village is 74 km away from domestic airport in Ludhiana and the nearest international airport is located in Chandigarh also Sri Guru Ram Dass Jee International Airport is the second nearest airport which is 110 km away in Amritsar.
