= Ummarwal Billa =

- Village
- Location in Punjab, India Ummarwal Billa (India)
- Coordinates: 31.0140006°N 75.4708103°E
- Country: India
- State: Punjab
- District: Jalandhar
- Tehsil: Nakodar

Government
  - Type: Panchayat raj
  - Body: Gram panchayat
- Elevation: 240 m (790 ft)

Population (2011)
  - Total: 2,422
- Sex ratio 1228/1194 ♂/♀

Languages
  - Official: Punjabi
- Time zone: UTC+5:30 (IST)
- ISO 3166 code: IN-PB
- Vehicle registration: PB- 08
- Website: jalandhar.nic.in

Ummarwal Billa is a village in Nakodar in Jalandhar district of Punjab State, India. It is located 15 kilometres (9.3 mi) from Nakodar, 49 kilometres (30 mi) from Kapurthala, 39 kilometres (24 mi) from the district headquarters Jalandhar and 155 kilometres (96 mi) from the state capital Chandigarh. The village is administered by a sarpanch, who is an elected representative of the village as per the Panchayati Raj (India).

== Demography ==
As of 2011, the village had a total number of 499 houses and a population of 2422, of which 1228 are males, while 1194 are females, according to the report published by Census India. Literacy rate of the village was 72.43%, lower than the state average of 75.84%. The population of children under the age of 6 years is 286, which is 11.81% of the total population of the village, and the child sex ratio is approximately 972, higher than the state average of 846.

Most of the people are from Schedule Caste, which constitutes 37.86% of the total population in the village. The town does not have any Schedule Tribe population so far.

As per the census of 2011, 943 people were engaged in work activities out of the total population of the village. which includes 722 males and 221 females. According to the census survey report of 2011, 90.46% workers describe their work as their main work and 9.54% workers are involved in marginal activities, providing livelihood for less than 6 months.

== Transport ==
Nakodar railway station is the nearest train station. The village is 65 kilometres (40 mi) away from the domestic airport in Ludhiana, and the nearest international airport is located in Chandigarh. Also, Sri Guru Ram Dass Jee International Airport is the second nearest airport, which is 129 kilometres (80 mi) away in Amritsar.
