= Chuhar =

Village in Punjab, India

Chuhar is a small village in Nakodar tehsil, Jalandhar district, Punjab, India. As of the 2011 Census of India, it had a population of 1,231 across 250 households.
