= Tandaura =

- Village (Punjab, India)
- Location in Punjab, India Tandaura (India)
- Coordinates: 31.0467495°N 75.4772946°E
- Country: India
- State: Punjab
- District: Jalandhar
- Tehsil: Nakodar

Government
  - Type: Panchayat raj
  - Body: Gram panchayat
- Elevation: 240 m (790 ft)

Population (2011)
  - Total: 1,013
- Sex ratio 493/520 ♂/♀

Languages
  - Official: Punjabi
- Time zone: UTC+5:30 (IST)
- ISO 3166 code: IN-PB
- Vehicle registration: PB- 08
- Website: jalandhar.nic.in

Tandaura is a village in Nakodar in Jalandhar district of Punjab State, India. It is located 13 kilometres (8.1 mi) from Nakodar, 46 kilometres (29 mi) from Kapurthala, 37 kilometres (23 mi) from district headquarter Jalandhar and 155 kilometres (96 mi) from state capital Chandigarh. The village is administrated by a sarpanch who is an elected representative of village as per Panchayati raj (India).

== Demography ==
As of 2011, the village has a total number of 172 houses and a population of 1013 of which include 493 are males while 520 are females according to the report published by Census India in 2011. The literacy rate of the village is 80.31%, higher than state average of 75.84%. The population of children under the age of 6 years is 114 which is 11.25% of total population of the village, and child sex ratio is approximately 1426 higher than the state average of 846.

Most of the people are from Schedule Caste which constitutes 37.41% of total population in the village. The town does not have any Schedule Tribe population so far.

As per census 2011, 327 people were engaged in work activities out of the total population of the village which includes 280 males and 47 females. According to census survey report 2011, 89.30% workers describe their work as main work and 10.70% workers are involved in marginal activity providing livelihood for less than 6 months.

== Transport ==
Nakodar railway station is the nearest train station. The village is 61 kilometres (38 mi) away from domestic airport in Ludhiana and the nearest international airport is located in Chandigarh also Sri Guru Ram Dass Jee International Airport is the second nearest airport which is 127 kilometres (79 mi) away in Amritsar.
