= Saham, Punjab =

Saham
- Village
- Location in Punjab, India Saham (India)
- Coordinates: 31.2145905°N 75.4617703°E
- Country: India
- State: Punjab
- District: Jalandhar
- Tehsil: Nakodar

Government
  - Type: Panchayat raj
  - Body: Gram panchayat
- Elevation: 240 m (790 ft)

Population (2011)
  - Total: 796
- Sex ratio 396/400 ♂/♀

Languages
  - Official: Punjabi
- Time zone: UTC+5:30 (IST)
- ISO 3166 code: IN-PB
- Vehicle registration: PB- 08
- Website: jalandhar.nic.in

Saham also spelled as Seham is a village in Nakodar in the Jalandhar district of Punjab State, India. It is located 14.7 kilometres (9.1 mi) from Nakodar, 27.8 kilometres (17.3 mi) from Kapurthala, 17.4 kilometres (10.8 mi) from district headquarter Jalandhar and 162 kilometres (101 mi) from state capital Chandigarh. The village is administrated by a sarpanch, an elected representative of the village as per Panchayati raj (India).

== Transport ==
Nakodar railway station is the nearest train station. The village is 73 kilometres (45 mi) away from the domestic airport in Ludhiana and the nearest international airport is located in Chandigarh also Sri Guru Ram Dass Jee International Airport is the second nearest airport which is 108 kilometres (67 mi) away in Amritsar.
