= Chak Vendal =

- Village
- Location in Punjab, India Chak Vendal (India)
- Coordinates: 31°11′51.87″N 75°32′18.04″E
- Country: India
- State: Punjab
- District: Jalandhar
- Tehsil: Nakodar

Government
  - Type: Panchayat raj
  - Body: Gram panchayat

Area
  - Total: 526 ha (1,300 acres)

Population (2011)
  - Total: 1,693; 859/834 ♂/♀
  - Scheduled Castes: 775; 388/387 ♂/♀
  - Total Households: 387

Languages
  - Official: Punjabi
- Time zone: UTC+5:30 (IST)
- ISO 3166 code: IN-PB
- Website: jalandhar.gov.in

Chak Vendal is a village in Nakodar in Jalandhar district of Punjab State, India. It is located 10 kilometres (6.2 mi) from sub district headquarter and 20 kilometres (12 mi) from district headquarter. The village is administrated by Sarpanch an elected representative of the village.

== Demography ==
As of 2011, The village has a total number of 387 houses and the population of 1693 of which 859 are males while 834 are females. According to the report published by Census India in 2011, out of the total population of the village 775 people are from Schedule Caste and the village does not have any Schedule Tribe population so far.

== See also ==
- List of villages in India
