= Bara Aslam =

- Village
- Location in Punjab, India Bara Aslam (India)
- Coordinates: 31.0832746°N 75.4508552°E
- Country: India
- State: Punjab
- District: Jalandhar
- Tehsil: Nakodar

Government
  - Type: Panchayat raj
  - Body: Gram panchayat
- Elevation: 240 m (790 ft)

Population (2011)
  - Total: 412
- Sex ratio 206/206 ♂/♀

Languages
  - Official: Punjabi
- Time zone: UTC+5:30 (IST)
- PIN: 144041
- ISO 3166 code: IN-PB
- Vehicle registration: PB- 08
- Website: jalandhar.nic.in

Bara Aslam is a village situated in Nakodar, within the Jalandhar district of Punjab State, India. It is located 7 km from Nakodar, 41 km from Kapurthala, 31.7 km from district headquarter in Jalandhar and 150 km from state capital Chandigarh. The village is administrated by a sarpanch who is an elected representative of village as per Panchayati raj (India).

== Transport ==
Pajian railway station is the nearest train station; however, Jalandhar city train station is located at a distance of 37 km from the village. The village is 67.8 km away from domestic airport in Ludhiana and the nearest international airport is located in Chandigarh also Sri Guru Ram Dass Jee International Airport is the second nearest airport which is 118 km away in Amritsar.
