= Dhadda Dilkhapur =

- Village
- Location in Punjab, India Dhadda Dilkhapur (India)
- Coordinates: 31.1544855°N 75.3187653°E
- Country: India
- State: Punjab
- District: Jalandhar
- Tehsil: Nakodar

Government
  - Type: Panchayat raj
  - Body: Gram panchayat
- Elevation: 240 m (790 ft)

Population (2011)
  - Total: 296
- Sex ratio 147/149 ♂/♀

Languages
  - Official: Punjabi
- Time zone: UTC+5:30 (IST)
- PIN: 144701
- Telephone: 01821
- ISO 3166 code: IN-PB
- Vehicle registration: PB- 08
- Website: jalandhar.nic.in

Dhadda Dilkhapur is a village in Nakodar in Jalandhar district of Punjab State, India. It is located 18 km from Nakodar, 30 km from Kapurthala, 42 km from district headquarter Jalandhar and 174 km from state capital Chandigarh. The village is administrated by a sarpanch who is an elected representative of village as per Panchayati raj (India).

== Transport ==
Nakodar railway station is the nearest train station. The village is 81 km away from domestic airport in Ludhiana and the nearest international airport is located in Chandigarh also Sri Guru Ram Dass Jee International Airport is the second nearest airport which is 107 km away in Amritsar.
