= Behar, Punjab =

Behar
- Village
- Location in Punjab, India Behar (India)
- Coordinates: 30.9822081°N 75.5072702°E
- Country: India
- State: Punjab
- District: Jalandhar
- Tehsil: Nakodar

Government
  - Type: Panchayat raj
  - Body: Gram panchayat
- Elevation: 240 m (790 ft)

Population (2011)
  - Total: 776
- Sex ratio 407/369 ♂/♀

Languages
  - Official: Punjabi
- Time zone: UTC+5:30 (IST)
- ISO 3166 code: IN-PB
- Vehicle registration: PB- 08
- Website: jalandhar.nic.in

Behar is a village in Nakodar in Jalandhar district of Punjab State, India. It is located 19.7 km (12.2 mi) from Nakodar, 30 km (19 mi) from Phillaur, 43 km (27 mi) from district headquarter Jalandhar and 153 km (95 mi) from state capital Chandigarh. The village is administrated by a sarpanch who is an elected representative of village as per Panchayati raj (India).

== Transport ==
Nakodar railway station is the nearest train station, Phillaur Junction train station is 29 km (18 mi) away from the village. The village is 60 km (37 mi) away from a domestic airport in Ludhiana and the nearest international airport is located in Chandigarh. Sri Guru Ram Dass Jee International Airport is the second nearest airport, which is 134 km (83 mi) away in Amritsar.
