= Dhadda Hundal =

- Village
- Location in Punjab, India Dhadda Hundal (India)
- Coordinates: 31.157883°N 75.3497652°E
- Country: India
- State: Punjab
- District: Jalandhar
- Tehsil: Nakodar

Government
  - Type: Panchayat raj
  - Body: Gram panchayat
- Elevation: 240 m (790 ft)

Population (2011)
  - Total: 286
- Sex ratio 145/141 ♂/♀

Languages
  - Official: Punjabi
- Time zone: UTC+5:30 (IST)
- PIN: 144701
- Telephone: 01821
- ISO 3166 code: IN-PB
- Vehicle registration: PB- 08
- Website: jalandhar.nic.in

Dhadda Hundal is a village in Nakodar in Jalandhar district of Punjab State, India. It is located 17 km from Nakodar, 33 km from Kapurthala, 34 km from district headquarter Jalandhar and 173 km from state capital Chandigarh. The village is administrated by a sarpanch who is an elected representative of village as per Panchayati raj (India).

== Transport ==
Nakodar railway station is the nearest train station. The village is 79 km away from Ludhiana Airport in Ludhiana, and the nearest international airport is Chandigarh Airport in Chandigarh. Sri Guru Ram Dass Jee International Airport is the second nearest airport which is 107 kilometres away in Amritsar.
