= Miranpur, Nakodar =

Miranpur
- Village
- Location in Punjab, India Miranpur (India)
- Coordinates: 31.552918°N 75.4754052°E
- Country: India
- State: Punjab
- District: Jalandhar
- Tehsil: Nakodar

Government
  - Type: Panchayat raj
  - Body: Gram panchayat
- Elevation: 240 m (790 ft)

Population (2011)
  - Total: 785
- Sex ratio 414/371 ♂/♀

Languages
  - Official: Punjabi
- Time zone: UTC+5:30 (IST)
- PIN: 144041
- ISO 3166 code: IN-PB
- Vehicle registration: PB- 08
- Website: jalandhar.nic.in

Miranpur is a village in Nakodar in Jalandhar district of Punjab State, India. It is located 4 kilometres (2.5 mi) from Nakodar, 36 kilometres (22 mi) from Kapurthala, 32 kilometres (20 mi) from district headquarter Jalandhar and 142 kilometres (88 mi) from state capital Chandigarh. The village is administrated by a sarpanch Lachman dass who is an elected representative of village as per Panchayati raj (India).

== Transport ==
Nakodar railway station is the nearest train station. The village is 68 kilometres (42 mi) away from domestic airport in Ludhiana and the nearest international airport is located in Chandigarh also Sri Guru Ram Dass Jee International Airport is the second nearest airport which is 82 kilometres (51 mi) away in Amritsar.
