= Budhi Pind =

Coordinates: 31°06′N 75°28′E

- Village
- Interactive map of Budhi Pind
- Country: India
- State: Punjab
- District: Jalandhar

Languages
  - Official: Punjabi
- Time zone: UTC+5:30 (IST)
- Telephone code: 1821
- Vehicle registration: PB- 08

Budhi Pind or Budi Pind is a very small village in Nakodar. Nakodar is a tehsil in the city Jalandhar of Indian state of Punjab.

== About ==
Budhi Pind is almost 3 km from Nakodar. The nearest main road to Budhi Pind is the Mehatpur road. The nearest Railway station to this village is Nakodar Railway station which is approximately 3.1 km from it.
