= Bir Baloki =

- Village
- Location in Punjab, India Bir Baloki (India)
- Coordinates: 31.0175905°N 75.4056953°E
- Country: India
- State: Punjab
- District: Jalandhar
- Tehsil: Nakodar

Government
  - Type: Panchayat raj
  - Body: Gram panchayat
- Elevation: 240 m (790 ft)

Population (2011)
  - Total: 1,423
- Sex ratio 726/697 ♂/♀

Languages
  - Official: Punjabi
- Time zone: UTC+5:30 (IST)
- PIN: 144041
- Telephone: 01821
- ISO 3166 code: IN-PB
- Vehicle registration: PB- 08
- Website: jalandhar.nic.in

Bir Baloki is a village near Mehatpur in Nakodar in Jalandhar district of Punjab State, India. It is located 16 km from Nakodar, 50 km from Kapurthala, 40 km from district headquarter Jalandhar and 162 km from state capital Chandigarh. The village is administrated by a sarpanch who is an elected representative of village as per Panchayati raj (India).

== Transport ==
Nakodar railway station is the nearest train station only and well facilities of G.T. roads however, Phillaur Junction train station is 40 km away from the village. The village is 69 km away from domestic airport in Ludhiana and the nearest international airport is located in Chandigarh also Sri Guru Ram Dass Jee International Airport is the second nearest airport which is 127 km away in Amritsar.
