= Sangowal, Jalandhar =

Sangowal
- Village
- Country: India
- State: Punjab
- District: Jalandhar
- Tehsil: Nakodar

Government
  - Type: Panchayat raj
  - Body: Gram panchayat

Area
  - Total: 400 ha (990 acres)

Population (2011)
  - Total: 2,591; 1,362/1,229 ♂/♀
  - Scheduled Castes: 1,060; 557/503 ♂/♀
  - Total Households: 483

Languages
  - Official: Punjabi
- Time zone: UTC+5:30 (IST)
- ISO 3166 code: IN-PB
- Website: jalandhar.gov.in

Sangowal is a village in Nakodar in Jalandhar district of Punjab State, India. It is located 16 kilometres (9.9 mi) from sub district headquarter and 38 kilometres (24 mi) from district headquarter. The village is administrated by Sarpanch an elected representative of the village.

== Demography ==
As of 2011, the village has a total number of 483 houses and a population of 2591 of which 1362 are males while 1229 are females. According to the report published by Census India in 2011, out of the total population of the village 1060 people are from Schedule Caste and the village does not have any Schedule Tribe population so far.

== See also ==
- List of villages in India
