= Khairulapur =

- Village
- Location in Punjab, India Khairulapur (India)
- Coordinates: 30.9948456°N 75.3737703°E
- Country: India
- State: Punjab
- District: Jalandhar
- Tehsil: Nakodar

Government
  - Type: Panchayat raj
  - Body: Gram panchayat
- Elevation: 240 m (790 ft)

Population (2011)
  - Total: 999
- Sex ratio 510/489 ♂/♀

Languages
  - Official: Punjabi
- Time zone: UTC+5:30 (IST)
- PIN: 144041
- Telephone: 01821
- ISO 3166 code: IN-PB
- Vehicle registration: PB- 08
- Website: jalandhar.nic.in

Khairulapur is a village in Nakodar in Jalandhar district of Punjab State, India. It is located 23 kilometres (14 mi) from Nakodar, 59 kilometres (37 mi) from Kapurthala, 47 kilometres (29 mi) from district headquarter Jalandhar and 160 kilometres (99 mi) from state capital Chandigarh. The village is administrated by a sarpanch who is an elected representative of village as per Panchayati raj (India).

== Transport ==
Nakodar railway station is the nearest train station. The village is 72.8 kilometres (45.2 mi) away from domestic airport in Ludhiana and the nearest international airport is located in Chandigarh also Sri Guru Ram Dass Jee International Airport is the second nearest airport which is 125 kilometres (78 mi) away in Amritsar.
