= Bangiwal =

- Village
- Location in Punjab, India Bangiwal (India)
- Coordinates: 30.9921138°N 75.4193303°E
- Country: India
- State: Punjab
- District: Jalandhar
- Tehsil: Nakodar

Government
  - Type: Panchayat raj
  - Body: Gram panchayat
- Elevation: 240 m (790 ft)

Population (2011)
  - Total: 817
- Sex ratio 432/385 ♂/♀

Languages
  - Official: Punjabi
- Time zone: UTC+5:30 (IST)
- PIN: 144041
- ISO 3166 code: IN-PB
- Vehicle registration: PB- 08
- Website: jalandhar.nic.in

Bangiwal is a village in Nakodar in Jalandhar district of Punjab State, India. It is located 19.4 km from Nakodar, 53.1 km from Kapurthala, 43.3 km from district headquarter Jalandhar and 153 km from state capital Chandigarh. The village is administrated by a sarpanch who is an elected representative of village as per Panchayati raj (India).

== Transport ==
Nakodar railway station is the nearest train station; however, Jalandhar city train station is 46 km away from the village. The village is 68 km away from domestic airport in Ludhiana and the nearest international airport is located in Chandigarh also Sri Guru Ram Dass Jee International Airport is the second nearest airport which is 126 km away in Amritsar.
