= Chhaula =

- Village
- Location in Punjab, India Chhaula (India)
- Coordinates: 30.9810756°N 75.4863153°E
- Country: India
- State: Punjab
- District: Jalandhar
- Tehsil: Nakodar

Government
  - Type: Panchayat raj
  - Body: Gram panchayat
- Elevation: 246 m (807 ft)

Population (2011)
  - Total: 468
- Sex ratio 215/213 ♂/♀

Languages
  - Official: Punjabi
- Time zone: UTC+5:30 (IST)
- PIN: 144410
- Telephone code: 01826
- ISO 3166 code: IN-PB
- Vehicle registration: PB 37
- Post office: Nakodar
- Website: jalandhar.nic.in

Chhaula is a village in the Nakodar tehsil of Jalandhar District of the Indian state of Punjab. It is located on 32 kilometres (20 mi) from the postal office in Phillaur, 19.6 kilometres (12.2 mi) from Nakodar, 43.6 kilometres (27.1 mi) from Jalandhar, and 148 kilometres (92 mi) from the state capital of Chandigarh. The village is administered by the Sarpanch, an elected representative.

== Demographics ==
According to the 2011 Census, Chhaula has a population of 468. The village has a literacy rate of 79.80%, higher than the average literacy rate of Punjab.

Most villagers belong to a Schedule Caste (SC), comprising 36.97% of the total.

== Education ==
The village has a co-ed primary school (Pri Chhaula School) which provide a mid-day meal as per the Indian Midday Meal Scheme and it was founded in 1971.

== Transport ==
Nakodar Railway Station is the nearest railway station which is 17 kilometres (11 mi) away from the village and Ludhiana Jn is 44 kilometres (27 mi) away.

The nearest airport is located 62 kilometres (39 mi) away in Ludhiana. Sri Guru Ram Dass Jee International Airport is 134 kilometres (83 mi) away; however, another international airport is located in Chandigarh.
