= Umrewal =

- Village
- Location in Punjab, India Umrewal (India)
- Coordinates: 30.9880956°N 75.5179204°E
- Country: India
- State: Punjab
- District: Jalandhar
- Tehsil: Nakodar

Government
  - Type: Panchayat raj
  - Body: Gram panchayat
- Elevation: 240 m (790 ft)

Population (2011)
  - Total: 486
- Sex ratio 256/228 ♂/♀

Languages
  - Official: Punjabi
- Time zone: UTC+5:30 (IST)
- ISO 3166 code: IN-PB
- Vehicle registration: PB- 08
- Website: jalandhar.nic.in

Umrewal is a village in Nakodar in Jalandhar district of Punjab State, India. It is located 20.5 kilometres (12.7 mi) from Nakodar, 54 kilometres (34 mi) from Kapurthala, 44.4 kilometres (27.6 mi) from district headquarter Jalandhar and 148 kilometres (92 mi) from state capital Chandigarh. The village is administrated by a sarpanch who is an elected representative of village as per Panchayati raj (India).

== Demography ==
As of 2011, The village has a total number of 93 houses and population of 484 of which include 286 are males while 228 are females according to the report published by Census India in 2011. Literacy rate of the village is 61.75%, lower than state average of 75.84%. The population of children under the age of 6 years is 84 which is 17.36% of total population of the village, and child sex ratio is approximately 891 higher than the state average of 846.

Most of the people are from Schedule Caste which constitutes 72.11% of total population in the village. The town does not have any Schedule Tribe population so far.

As per census 2011, 167 people were engaged in work activities out of the total population of the village which includes 136 males and 31 females. According to census survey report 2011, 99.40% workers describe their work as main work and 0.60% workers are involved in marginal activity providing livelihood for less than 6 months.

== Transport ==
Nakodar railway station is the nearest train station. The village is 55 kilometres (34 mi) away from domestic airport in Ludhiana and the nearest international airport is located in Chandigarh also Sri Guru Ram Dass Jee International Airport is the second nearest airport which is 134 kilometres (83 mi) away in Amritsar.
