= Lohar Nangal =

- Village
- Location in Punjab, India Lohar Nangal (India)
- Coordinates: 31.191856°N 75.5864952°E
- Country: India
- State: Punjab
- District: Jalandhar
- Tehsil: Nakodar

Government
  - Type: Panchayat raj
  - Body: Gram panchayat
- Elevation: 240 m (790 ft)

Population (2011)
  - Total: 95
- Sex ratio 43/52 ♂/♀

Languages
  - Official: Punjabi
- Time zone: UTC+5:30 (IST)
- ISO 3166 code: IN-PB
- Vehicle registration: PB- 08
- Website: jalandhar.nic.in

Lohar Nangal is a village in Nakodar in Jalandhar district of Punjab State, India. It is located 20 kilometres (12 mi) from Nakodar, 38 kilometres (24 mi) from Kapurthala, 180 kilometres (110 mi) from district headquarter Jalandhar and 150 kilometres (93 mi) from state capital Chandigarh. The village is administrated by a sarpanch who is an elected representative of village as per Panchayati raj (India).

== Transport ==
Nakodar railway station is the nearest train station. The village is 62.6 kilometres (38.9 mi) away from domestic airport in Ludhiana and the nearest international airport is located in Chandigarh also Sri Guru Ram Dass Jee International Airport is the second nearest airport which is 117 kilometres (73 mi) away in Amritsar.
