= Gill, Nakodar =

Gill
- Village
- Location in Punjab, India Gill (India)
- Coordinates: 31.1974214°N 75.2197622°E
- Country: India
- State: Punjab
- District: Jalandhar
- Tehsil: Nakodar

Government
  - Type: Panchayat raj
  - Body: Gram panchayat
- Elevation: 240 m (790 ft)

Population (2011)
  - Total: 1,411
- Sex ratio 719/692 ♂/♀

Languages
  - Official: Punjabi
- Time zone: UTC+5:30 (IST)
- PIN: 144626
- Telephone: 01821
- ISO 3166 code: IN-PB
- Vehicle registration: PB- 08
- Website: jalandhar.nic.in

Gill is a village in Nakodar in Jalandhar district of Punjab State, India. It is located 30 km from Nakodar, 28 km from Kapurthala, 44 km from district headquarter Jalandhar and 188 km from state capital Chandigarh. The village is administrated by a sarpanch who is an elected representative of village as per Panchayati raj (India).

== Transport ==
Nakodar railway station is the nearest train station. The village is 93 km away from domestic airport in Ludhiana and the nearest international airport is located in Chandigarh also Sri Guru Ram Dass Jee International Airport is the second nearest airport which is 90 km away in Amritsar.
