= Bal Kohna =

- Village
- Location in Punjab, India Bal Kohna (India)
- Coordinates: 31.1870046°N 75.3845358°E
- Country: India
- State: Punjab
- District: Jalandhar
- Tehsil: Nakodar

Government
  - Type: Panchayat raj
  - Body: Gram panchayat
- Elevation: 240 m (790 ft)

Population (2011)
  - Total: 751
- Sex ratio 377/374 ♂/♀

Languages
  - Official: Punjabi
- Time zone: UTC+5:30 (IST)
- PIN: 144039
- ISO 3166 code: IN-PB
- Vehicle registration: PB- 08
- Website: jalandhar.nic.in

Bal Kohna is a village in the municipal council of Nakodar, Jalandhar district, Punjab, India. It is located 12 km from Nakodar, 25.9 km from Kapurthala, 28.9 km from district headquarter Jalandhar and 157 km from state capital Chandigarh. The village is administrated by a sarpanch who is an elected representative of village as per Panchayati raj (India).

== Transport ==
Nakodar railway station is the nearest train station; however, Jalandhar city train station is 30 km away from the village. The village is 75.4 km away from domestic airport in Ludhiana and the nearest international airport is located in Chandigarh also Sri Guru Ram Dass Jee International Airport is the second nearest airport which is 105 km away in Amritsar.
