= Mandiala, Jalandhar =

Mandiala
- Village
- Country: India
- State: Punjab
- District: Jalandhar
- Tehsil: Nakodar

Government
  - Type: Panchayat raj
  - Body: Gram panchayat

Area
  - Total: 755 ha (1,870 acres)

Population (2011)
  - Total: 1,538; 777/761 ♂/♀
  - Scheduled Castes: 578; 295/283 ♂/♀
  - Total Households: 296

Languages
  - Official: Punjabi
- Time zone: UTC+5:30 (IST)
- ISO 3166 code: IN-PB
- Website: jalandhar.gov.in

Mandiala is a village in Nakodar in Jalandhar district of Punjab State, India. It is located 9 kilometres (5.6 mi) from sub district headquarter and 33 kilometres (21 mi) from district headquarter. The village is administrated by Sarpanch an elected representative of the village.

== Demography ==
As of 2011, the village has a total number of 296 houses and a population of 1,538 of which 777 are males while 761 are females. According to the report published by Census India in 2011, out of the total population of the village 578 people are from Schedule Caste and the village does not have any Schedule Tribe population so far.

== See also ==
- List of villages in India
