= Talwandi Bharo =

- Village
- Location in Punjab, India Talwandi Bharo (India)
- Coordinates: 31.1960204°N 75.4321053°E
- Country: India
- State: Punjab
- District: Jalandhar
- Tehsil: Nakodar

Government
  - Type: Panchayat raj
  - Body: Gram panchayat
- Elevation: 240 m (790 ft)

Population (2011)
  - Total: 2,303
- Sex ratio 1187/1116 ♂/♀

Languages
  - Official: Punjabi
- Time zone: UTC+5:30 (IST)
- ISO 3166 code: IN-PB
- Vehicle registration: PB- 08
- Website: jalandhar.nic.in

Talwandi Bharo is a village in Nakodar in Jalandhar district of Punjab State, India. It is located 11.7 kilometres (7.3 mi) from Nakodar, 27 kilometres (17 mi) from Kapurthala, 23 kilometres (14 mi) from district headquarter Jalandhar and 167 kilometres (104 mi) from state capital Chandigarh. The village is administrated by a sarpanch who is an elected representative of village as per Panchayati raj (India).

== Demography ==
As of 2011, the village has a total number of 438 houses and a population of 2303 of which include 1187 are males while 1116 are females according to the report published by Census India in 2011. The literacy rate of the village is 70.33%, lower than state average of 75.84%. The population of children under the age of 6 years is 254 which is 11.3% of total population of the village, and child sex ratio is approximately 728 lower than the state average of 846.

Most of the people are from Schedule Caste which constitutes 52.50% of total population in the village. The town does not have any Schedule Tribe population so far.

As per census 2011, 774 people were engaged in work activities out of the total population of the village which includes 668 males and 106 females. According to census survey report 2011, 82.69% workers describe their work as main work and 17.31% workers are involved in marginal activity providing livelihood for less than 6 months.

== Transport ==
Nakodar railway station is the nearest train station. The village is 73 kilometres (45 mi) away from domestic airport in Ludhiana and the nearest international airport is located in Chandigarh also Sri Guru Ram Dass Jee International Airport is the second nearest airport which is 107 kilometres (66 mi) away in Amritsar.
