= Nawan Pind Araian =

- Village
- Location in Punjab, India Nawan Pind Araian (India)
- Coordinates: 31.1098431°N 75.5254645°E
- Country: India
- State: Punjab
- District: Jalandhar
- Tehsil: Nakodar

Government
  - Type: Panchayat raj
  - Body: Gram panchayat
- Elevation: 240 m (790 ft)

Population (2011)
  - Total: 1,346
- Sex ratio 695/651 ♂/♀

Languages
  - Official: Punjabi
- Time zone: UTC+5:30 (IST)
- ISO 3166 code: IN-PB
- Vehicle registration: PB- 08
- Website: jalandhar.nic.in

Nawan Pind Araian is a village in Nakodar in Jalandhar district of Punjab State, India. It is located 5 kilometres (3.1 mi) from Nakodar, 41 kilometres (25 mi) from Kapurthala, 29 kilometres (18 mi) from district headquarter Jalandhar and 149 kilometres (93 mi) from state capital Chandigarh. The village is administrated by a sarpanch who is an elected representative of village as per Panchayati raj (India).

== Transport ==
Nakodar railway station is the nearest train station. The village is 56 kilometres (35 mi) away from a domestic airport in Ludhiana, while the nearest international airport is located in Chandigarh. Sri Guru Ram Dass Jee International Airport is the second nearest airport, which is 122 kilometres (76 mi) away in Amritsar.
