= Tut, Punjab =

Tut
- Village
- Location in Punjab, India Tut (India)
- Coordinates: 31.1582555°N 75.4179153°E
- Country: India
- State: Punjab
- District: Jalandhar
- Tehsil: Nakodar

Government
  - Type: Panchayat raj
  - Body: Gram panchayat
- Elevation: 240 m (790 ft)

Population (2011)
  - Total: 1,549
- Sex ratio 347/410 ♂/♀

Languages
  - Official: Punjabi
- Time zone: UTC+5:30 (IST)
- ISO 3166 code: IN-PB
- Vehicle registration: PB- 08
- Website: jalandhar.nic.in

Tut is a village in Nakodar in Jalandhar district of Punjab State, India. It is located 6 kilometres (3.7 mi) from Nakodar, 29 kilometres (18 mi) from Kapurthala, 29.5 kilometres (18.3 mi) from district headquarter Jalandhar and 160 kilometres (99 mi) from state capital Chandigarh. The village is administrated by a sarpanch who is an elected representative of village as per Panchayati raj (India).

== Demography ==
As of 2011, The village has a total number of 334 houses and population of 1549 of which include 739 are males while 810 are females according to the report published by Census India in 2011. Literacy rate of the village is 77.19%, higher than state average of 75.84%. The population of children under the age of 6 years is 155 which is 10.01% of total population of the village, and child sex ratio is approximately 938 higher than the state average of 846.

Most of the people are from Schedule Caste which constitutes 36.15% of total population in the village. The town does not have any Schedule Tribe population so far.

As per census 2011, 450 people were engaged in work activities out of the total population of the village which includes 399 males and 51 females. According to census survey report 2011, 82.44% workers describe their work as main work and 17.56% workers are involved in marginal activity providing livelihood for less than 6 months.

== Transport ==
Nakodar railway station is the nearest train station. The village is 67 kilometres (42 mi) away from domestic airport in Ludhiana and the nearest international airport is located in Chandigarh also Sri Guru Ram Dass Jee International Airport is the second nearest airport which is 110 kilometres (68 mi) away in Amritsar.
