= Bitlan =

- Village
- Location in Punjab, India Bitlan (India)
- Coordinates: 30.9882041°N 75.4643576°E
- Country: India
- State: Punjab
- District: Jalandhar
- Tehsil: Nakodar

Government
  - Type: Panchayat raj
  - Body: Gram panchayat
- Elevation: 240 m (790 ft)

Population (2011)
  - Total: 696
- Sex ratio 354/342 ♂/♀

Languages
  - Official: Punjabi
- Time zone: UTC+5:30 (IST)
- PIN: 144041
- Telephone: 01821
- ISO 3166 code: IN-PB
- Vehicle registration: PB- 08
- Website: jalandhar.nic.in

Bitlan is a village in Nakodar in Jalandhar district of Punjab State, India. It is located 19 km from Nakodar, 53 km from Kapurthala, 44 km from district headquarter Jalandhar and 156 km from state capital Chandigarh. The village is administrated by a sarpanch who is an elected representative of village as per Panchayati raj (India).

== Transport ==
Nakodar railway station is the nearest train station; however, Phillaur Junction train station is 36 km away from the village. The village is 65 km away from domestic airport in Ludhiana and the nearest international airport is located in Chandigarh also Sri Guru Ram Dass Jee International Airport is the second nearest airport which is 133 km away in Amritsar.
