= Qaimwala =

- Village
- Country: India
- State: Punjab
- District: Jalandhar
- Tehsil: Nakodar

Government
  - Type: Panchayat raj
  - Body: Gram panchayat

Area
  - Total: 246 ha (610 acres)

Population (2011)
  - Total: 979; 489/490 ♂/♀
  - Scheduled Castes: 533; 261/272 ♂/♀
  - Total Households: 184

Languages
  - Official: Punjabi
- Time zone: UTC+5:30 (IST)
- ISO 3166 code: IN-PB
- Website: jalandhar.gov.in

Qaimwala is a village in Nakodar in Jalandhar district of Punjab State, India. It is located 24 kilometres (15 mi) from sub district headquarter and 45 kilometres (28 mi) from district headquarter. The village is administrated by Sarpanch an elected representative of the village.

== Demography ==
As of 2011, the village has a total number of 184 houses and a population of 979 of which 489 are males while 490 are females. According to the report published by Census India in 2011, out of the total population of the village 533 people are from Schedule Caste and the village does not have any Schedule Tribe population so far.

== See also ==
- List of villages in India
