= Malri =

- Village
- Country: India
- State: Punjab
- District: Jalandhar

Languages
  - Official: Punjabi
- Time zone: UTC+5:30 (IST)
- PIN: 144040
- Telephone code: 1821
- Vehicle registration: PB- 08

Malri is a village in Nakodar. Nakodar is a tehsil in the city Jalandhar of Indian state of Punjab.

== Transportation ==
Malri lies on the Nakodar-Jalandhar road. It is almost one km from Nakodar. The nearest railway station to Malri is Nakodar railway station at a distance of one km.

Malri is famous for Baba Mal.

== Post code & STD code ==
Malri's post code and STD code are 144040 and 01821 respectively.
