= Bila Nawab =

- Village
- Location in Punjab, India Bila Nawab (India)
- Coordinates: 31.1449881°N 75.4227602°E
- Country: India
- State: Punjab
- District: Jalandhar
- Tehsil: Nakodar

Government
  - Type: Panchayat raj
  - Body: Gram panchayat
- Elevation: 240 m (790 ft)

Population (2011)
  - Total: 716
- Sex ratio 379/337 ♂/♀

Languages
  - Official: Punjabi
- Time zone: UTC+5:30 (IST)
- PIN: 144040
- ISO 3166 code: IN-PB
- Vehicle registration: PB- 08
- Website: jalandhar.nic.in

Bila Nawab is a village in Nakodar in Jalandhar district of Punjab State, India. It is located 6 km from Nakodar, 31 km from Kapurthala, 30 km from district headquarter Jalandhar and 161 km from state capital Chandigarh. The village is administrated by a sarpanch who is an elected representative of village as per Panchayati raj (India).

== Transport ==
Nakodar railway station is the nearest train station; however, Phagwara Junction train station is 39 km away from the village. The village is 69 km away from domestic airport in Ludhiana and the nearest international airport is located in Chandigarh also Sri Guru Ram Dass Jee International Airport is the second nearest airport which is 111 km away in Amritsar.
