= Samailpur, Jalandhar =

Samailpur
- Village
- Country: India
- State: Punjab
- District: Jalandhar
- Tehsil: Nakodar

Government
  - Type: Panchayat raj
  - Body: Gram panchayat

Area
  - Total: 222 ha (550 acres)

Population (2011)
  - Total: 1,362; 713/649 ♂/♀
  - Scheduled Castes: 983; 516/467 ♂/♀
  - Total Households: 248

Languages
  - Official: Punjabi
- Time zone: UTC+5:30 (IST)
- ISO 3166 code: IN-PB
- Website: jalandhar.gov.in

Samailpur is a village in Nakodar in Jalandhar district of Punjab State, India. It is located 14 kilometres (8.7 mi) from sub district headquarter and 40 kilometres (25 mi) from district headquarter. The village is administrated by Sarpanch an elected representative of the village.

== Demography ==
As of 2011, the village has a total number of 248 houses and a population of 1362 of which 713 are males while 649 are females. According to the report published by Census India in 2011, out of the total population of the village 983 people are from Schedule Caste and the village does not have any Schedule Tribe population so far.

== See also ==
- List of villages in India
