= Gohir =

- village
- Location in Punjab, India Gohir (India)
- Coordinates: 31.180335°N 75.492556°E
- Country: India
- State: Punjab
- District: Jalandhar
- Talukas: Nakodar

Languages
  - Official: Punjabi
  - Regional: Punjabi
- Time zone: UTC+5:30 (IST)
- Telephone code: 0181
- Vehicle registration: PB- 08
- Nearest city: Nakodar

Gohir is a small village in Nakodar. Nakodar is a tehsil in the city Jalandhar of Indian state of Punjab.

== Transport ==
Gohir lies on the Nakodar-Jalandhar road. It is almost 4 km from Nakodar bus stand. The nearest main road to Gohir is Nakodar-Jalandhar road. The nearest Railway station to this village is Nakodar Railway station. After the establishment of the Nakodar bypass traffic in the village has nearly ceased.

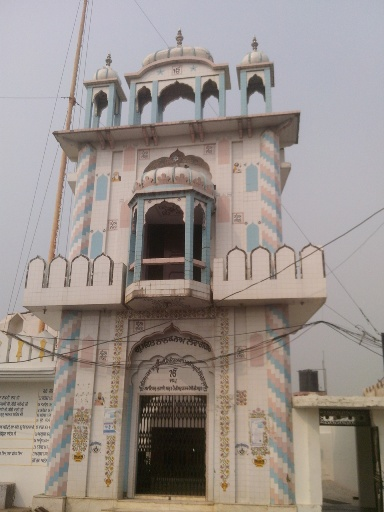
Gohir village's Gurdwara

== STD code ==
Gohir's STD code is 01821.
