= Kang Sahibrai =

- Village
- Location in Punjab, India Kang Sahibrai (India)
- Coordinates: 31.1797347°N 75.4216702°E
- Country: India
- State: Punjab
- District: Jalandhar
- Tehsil: Nakodar

Government
  - Type: Panchayat raj
  - Body: Gram panchayat

Area
  - Total: 290 ha (720 acres)

Population (2011)
  - Total: 1,260; 640/620 ♂/♀
  - Scheduled Castes: 363; 177/186 ♂/♀
  - Total Households: 234

Languages
  - Official: Punjabi
- Time zone: UTC+5:30 (IST)
- Telephone: 01821
- ISO 3166 code: IN-PB
- Website: jalandhar.gov.in

Kang Sahibrai is a village in Nakodar in Jalandhar district of Punjab State, India. It is located 12 kilometres (7.5 mi) from sub district headquarter and 25 kilometres (16 mi) from district headquarter. The village is administrated by Sarpanch an elected representative of the village.

== Demography ==
As of 2011, the village has a total number of 234 houses and a population of 1260 of which 640 are males while 620 are females. According to the report published by Census India in 2011, out of the total population of the village 363 people are from Schedule Caste and the village does not have any Schedule Tribe population so far.

== See also ==
- List of villages in India
