= Sianiwal =

- Village
- Country: India
- State: Punjab
- District: Jalandhar
- Tehsil: Nakodar

Government
  - Type: Panchayat raj
  - Body: Gram panchayat

Area
  - Total: 106.95 ha (264.3 acres)

Population (2011)
  - Total: 872; 454/418 ♂/♀
  - Scheduled Castes: 743; 389/354 ♂/♀
  - Total Households: 169

Languages
  - Official: Punjabi
- Time zone: UTC+5:30 (IST)
- ISO 3166 code: IN-PB
- Website: jalandhar.gov.in

Sianiwal is a village in Nakodar in Jalandhar district of Punjab State, India. It is located 4 kilometres (2.5 mi) from sub district headquarter and 24 kilometres (15 mi) from district headquarter. The village is administrated by Sarpanch an elected representative of the village.

== Demography ==
As of 2011, the village has a total number of 169 houses and a population of 872 of which 454 are males while 418 are females. According to the report published by Census India in 2011, out of the total population of the village 743 people are from Schedule Caste and the village does not have any Schedule Tribe population so far.

== See also ==
- List of villages in India
