= Lohgarh, Nakodar =

Lohgarh
- Village
- Country: India
- State: Punjab
- District: Jalandhar
- Tehsil: Nakodar

Government
  - Type: Panchayat raj
  - Body: Gram panchayat

Area
  - Total: 324 ha (800 acres)

Population (2011)
  - Total: 1,095; 569/526 ♂/♀
  - Scheduled Castes: 491; 254/237 ♂/♀
  - Total Households: 210

Languages
  - Official: Punjabi
- Time zone: UTC+5:30 (IST)
- ISO 3166 code: IN-PB
- Website: jalandhar.gov.in

Lohgarh is a village in Nakodar in Jalandhar district of Punjab State, India. It is located 20 kilometres (12 mi) from sub district headquarters and 44 kilometres (27 mi) from district headquarters. The village is administered by a Sarpanch who is an elected representative of the village.

== Demography ==
As of 2011, the village has a total number of 210 houses and a population of 1095 of which 569 are males while 526 are females. According to the report published by Census India in 2011, out of the total population of the village 491 people are from Schedule Caste and the village does not have any Schedule Tribe population so far.

== See also ==
- List of villages in India
