= Sarai Kham =

- Village
- Location in Punjab, India Sarai Kham (India)
- Coordinates: 31.156998°N 75.3546701°E
- Country: India
- State: Punjab
- District: Jalandhar
- Tehsil: Nakodar

Government
  - Type: Panchayat raj
  - Body: Gram panchayat
- Elevation: 240 m (790 ft)

Population (2011)
  - Total: 417
- Sex ratio 213/204 ♂/♀

Languages
  - Official: Punjabi
- Time zone: UTC+5:30 (IST)
- ISO 3166 code: IN-PB
- Vehicle registration: PB- 08
- Website: jalandhar.nic.in

Sarai Kham is a village in Nakodar in Jalandhar district of Punjab State, India. It is located 16.4 kilometres (10.2 mi) from Nakodar, 32 kilometres (20 mi) from Kapurthala, 33 kilometres (21 mi) from district headquarter Jalandhar and 171 kilometres (106 mi) from state capital Chandigarh. The village is administrated by a sarpanch who is an elected representative of village as per Panchayati raj (India).

== Transport ==
Nakodar railway station is the nearest train station. The village is 77 kilometres (48 mi) away from domestic airport in Ludhiana and the nearest international airport is located in Chandigarh also Sri Guru Ram Dass Jee International Airport is the second nearest airport which is 107 kilometres (66 mi) away in Amritsar.
