= Mahunwal =

- Village
- Location in Punjab, India Mahunwal (India)
- Coordinates: 31.110952°N 75.488333°E
- Country: India
- State: Punjab
- District: Jalandhar
- Talukas: Nakodar

Languages
  - Official: Punjabi
  - Regional: Punjabi
- Time zone: UTC+5:30 (IST)
- Telephone code: 0181
- Vehicle registration: PB- 08
- Nearest city: Nurmahal

Mahunwal is a small village in Nakodar. Nakodar is a tehsil in the city of Jalandhar in the Indian state of Punjab.

== About ==
The nearest main road to Mahunwal is Nakodar-Nurmahal road which is almost half a km from the village. The nearest Railway station to this village is Nakodar Railway station. Mahunwal's STD code is 01821.

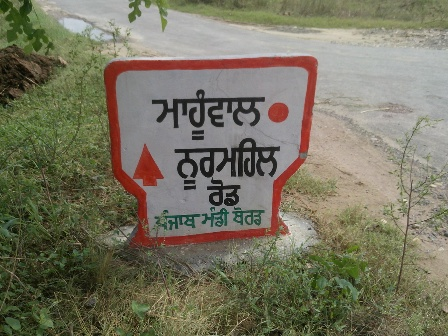
A way marker marking the limits of the village

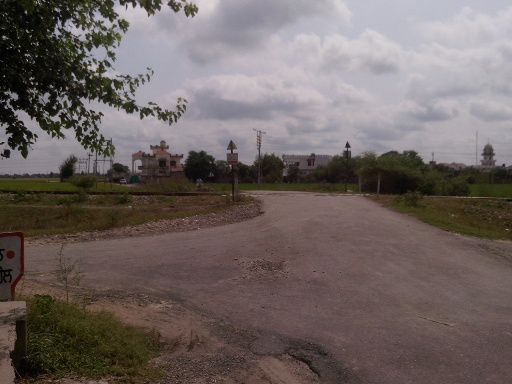
A distant view of Mahunwal
