= Chak Pirpur =

- Village
- Location in Punjab, India Chak Pirpur (India)
- Coordinates: 31.1982755°N 75.5305003°E
- Country: India
- State: Punjab
- District: Jalandhar
- Tehsil: Nakodar

Government
  - Type: Panchayat raj
  - Body: Gram panchayat
- Elevation: 240 m (790 ft)

Population (2011)
  - Total: 267
- Sex ratio 150/117 ♂/♀

Languages
  - Official: Punjabi
- Time zone: UTC+5:30 (IST)
- PIN: 144041
- Telephone: 01821
- ISO 3166 code: IN-PB
- Vehicle registration: PB- 08
- Website: jalandhar.nic.in

Chak Pirpur is a village in Nakodar in Jalandhar district of Punjab State, India. It is located 14 km from Nakodar, 34 km from Kapurthala, 19 km from district headquarter Jalandhar and 154 km from state capital Chandigarh. The village is administrated by a sarpanch who is an elected representative of village as per Panchayati raj (India).

== Transport ==
Nakodar railway station is the nearest train station however, Jalandhar Junction train station is 20 km away from the village. The village is 68 km away from domestic airport in Ludhiana and the nearest international airport is located in Chandigarh also Sri Guru Ram Dass Jee International Airport is the second nearest airport which is 115 km away in Amritsar.
