= Tahli, Nakodar =

Tahli
- village
- Location in Punjab, India Tahli (India)
- Coordinates: 31.161214°N 75.547269°E
- Country: India
- State: Punjab
- District: Jalandhar
- Talukas: Nakodar

Languages
  - Official: Punjabi
  - Regional: Punjabi
- Time zone: UTC+5:30 (IST)
- PIN: 144043
- Telephone code: 0181
- Vehicle registration: PB- 08
- Nearest city: Nakodar

Tahli is a village in Nakodar. Nakodar is a tehsil in the city Jalandhar of Indian state of Punjab.

== STD code ==
Tahli's STD code and post code are 01821 and 144043 respectively.
