= Shah Salempur =

- Village
- Location in Punjab, India Shah Salempur (India)
- Coordinates: 31.0344224°N 75.4580629°E
- Country: India
- State: Punjab
- District: Jalandhar
- Tehsil: Nakodar

Government
  - Type: Panchayat raj
  - Body: Gram panchayat
- Elevation: 240 m (790 ft)

Population (2011)
  - Total: 859
- Sex ratio 437/422 ♂/♀

Languages
  - Official: Punjabi
- Time zone: UTC+5:30 (IST)
- ISO 3166 code: IN-PB
- Vehicle registration: PB- 08
- Website: jalandhar.nic.in

Shah Salempur is a village in Nakodar in Jalandhar district of Punjab State, India. It is located 12 kilometres (7.5 mi) from Nakodar, 45 kilometres (28 mi) from Kapurthala, 36 kilometres (22 mi) from district headquarters Jalandhar and 161 kilometres (100 mi) from state capital Chandigarh. The village is administrated by a sarpanch who is an elected representative of village as per Panchayati raj (India).

== Transport ==
Nakodar railway station is the nearest train station. The village is 71 kilometres (44 mi) away from domestic airport in Ludhiana and the nearest international airport is located in Chandigarh also Sri Guru Ram Dass Jee International Airport is the second nearest airport which is 126 kilometres (78 mi) away in Amritsar.
