= Bath, Punjab =

Bath
- Village
- Location in Punjab, India Bath (India)
- Coordinates: 31.0767086°N 75.4988408°E
- Country: India
- State: Punjab
- District: Jalandhar
- Tehsil: Nakodar

Government
  - Type: Panchayat raj
  - Body: Gram panchayat
- Elevation: 240 m (790 ft)

Population (2011)
  - Total: 2,416
- Sex ratio 1198/1218 ♂/♀

Languages
  - Official: Punjabi
- Time zone: UTC+5:30 (IST)
- PIN: 144044
- Telephone: 01821
- ISO 3166 code: IN-PB
- Vehicle registration: PB- 08
- Post office: Sidhwan R.S.
- Website: jalandhar.nic.in

Bath is a village in Nakodar in Jalandhar district of Punjab State, India. It is located 7.8 km from Nakodar, 44.3 km from Kapurthala, 31.8 km from district headquarter Jalandhar and 142 km from state capital Chandigarh. The village is administrated by a sarpanch who is an elected representative of village as per Panchayati raj (India).

== Transport ==
Nakodar railway station is the nearest train station; however, Phagwara Junction train station is 35 km away from the village. The village is 59 km away from domestic airport in Ludhiana and the nearest international airport is located in Chandigarh also Sri Guru Ram Dass Jee International Airport is the second nearest airport which is 124 km away in Amritsar.
