= Bulanda, Punjab =

Bulanda Ravi Grover
- Village
- Location in Punjab, India Bulanda Ravi Grover (India)
- Coordinates: 31.0439582°N 75.4265821°E
- Country: India
- State: Punjab
- District: Jalandhar
- Tehsil: Nakodar

Government
  - Type: Panchayat raj
  - Body: Gram panchayat
- Elevation: 240 m (790 ft)

Population (2011)
  - Total: 1,014
- Sex ratio 523/491 ♂/♀

Languages
  - Official: Punjabi
- Time zone: UTC+5:30 (IST)
- PIN: 144041
- Telephone: 01821
- ISO 3166 code: IN-PB
- Vehicle registration: PB- 08
- Website: jalandhar.nic.in

Bulanda is a village in Nakodar in Jalandhar district of Punjab State, India. It is located 13 km from Nakodar, 48 km from Kapurthala, 40 km from district headquarters Jalandhar and 162 km from state capital Chandigarh. The village is administrated by a sarpanch who is an elected representative of village as per Panchayati raj (India).

== Transport ==
Nakodar railway station is the nearest train station however, Phillaur Junction train station is 38 km away from the village. The village is 67 km away from domestic airport in Ludhiana and the nearest international airport is located in Chandigarh also Sri Guru Ram Dass Jee International Airport is the second nearest airport which is 121 km away in Amritsar.
