= Gaunsuwal =

- Village
- Country: India
- State: Punjab
- District: Jalandhar
- Tehsil: Nakodar

Government
  - Type: Panchayat raj
  - Body: Gram panchayat

Area
  - Total: 128 ha (320 acres)

Population (2011)
  - Total: 1,040; 513/527 ♂/♀
  - Scheduled Castes: 903; 439/464 ♂/♀
  - Total Households: 178

Languages
  - Official: Punjabi
- Time zone: UTC+5:30 (IST)
- ISO 3166 code: IN-PB
- Website: jalandhar.gov.in

Gaunsuwal is a village in Nakodar in Jalandhar district of Punjab State, India. It is located 20 kilometres (12 mi) from sub district headquarter and 46 kilometres (29 mi) from district headquarter. The village is administrated by Sarpanch an elected representative of the village.

== Demography ==
As of 2011, the village has a total number of 178 houses and a population of 1040 of which 513 are males while 527 are females. According to the report published by Census India in 2011, out of the total population of the village 903 people are from Schedule Caste and the village does not have any Schedule Tribe population so far.

== See also ==
- List of villages in India
