= Kotla Jangan =

- Village
- Location in Punjab, India Kotla Jangan (India)
- Coordinates: 31.170938°N 75.4689852°E
- Country: India
- State: Punjab
- District: Jalandhar
- Tehsil: Nakodar

Government
  - Type: Panchayat raj
  - Body: Gram panchayat
- Elevation: 240 m (790 ft)

Population (2011)
  - Total: 898
- Sex ratio 462/436 ♂/♀

Languages
  - Official: Punjabi
- Time zone: UTC+5:30 (IST)
- PIN: 144630
- Telephone: 01821
- ISO 3166 code: IN-PB
- Vehicle registration: PB- 08
- Website: jalandhar.nic.in

Kotla Jangan is a village in Nakodar in Jalandhar district of Punjab State, India. It is located 8 kilometres (5.0 mi) from Nakodar, 34 kilometres (21 mi) from Kapurthala, 21 kilometres (13 mi) from district headquarter Jalandhar and 162 kilometres (101 mi) from state capital Chandigarh. The village is administrated by a sarpanch who is an elected representative of village as per Panchayati raj (India).

== Transport ==
Nakodar railway station is the nearest train station. The village is 68 kilometres (42 mi) away from domestic airport in Ludhiana and the nearest international airport is located in Chandigarh also Sri Guru Ram Dass Jee International Airport is the second nearest airport which is 114 kilometres (71 mi) away in Amritsar.
