= Khaira Mushtarka =

- Village
- Location in Punjab, India Khaira Mushtarka (India)
- Coordinates: 30.9916646°N 75.3921942°E
- Country: India
- State: Punjab
- District: Jalandhar
- Tehsil: Nakodar

Government
  - Type: Panchayat raj
  - Body: Gram panchayat
- Elevation: 246 m (807 ft)

Population (2011)
  - Total: 775
- Sex ratio 402/373 ♂/♀

Languages
  - Official: Punjabi
- Time zone: UTC+5:30 (IST)
- Telephone code: 01826
- ISO 3166 code: IN-PB
- Vehicle registration: PB 37
- Website: jalandhar.nic.in

Khaira Mushtarka is a village in the Nakodar tehsil of Jalandhar District of the Indian state of Punjab. It is located 20 kilometres (12 mi) away from Nakodar, 44 kilometres (27 mi) from Jalandhar, and 164 kilometres (102 mi) from the state capital of Chandigarh. The village is administered by the Sarpanch, an elected representative.

== Demographics ==
According to the 2011 Census, the village has a population of 775. The village has a literacy rate of 61.77%, higher than the average literacy rate of Punjab.

Most villagers belong to a Schedule Caste (SC) which makes up 55.87% of the total.

== Transport ==
=== Rail ===
The nearest railway station is located 17 kilometres (11 mi) away in Nakodar and Phillaur Jn railway station is 44 kilometres (27 mi) away from the village.

=== Airport ===
The nearest airport is located 68 kilometres (42 mi) away in Ludhiana. The nearest international airport is located in Amritsar.
