= Nurpur, Jalandhar =

Nurpur
- Village
- Location in Punjab, India Nurpur (India)
- Country: India
- State: Punjab
- District: Jalandhar
- Tehsil: Nakodar

Government
  - Type: Panchayat raj
  - Body: Gram panchayat

Area
  - Total: 365 ha (900 acres)

Population (2011)
  - Total: 1,993; 998/995 ♂/♀
  - Scheduled Castes: 846; 442/404 ♂/♀
  - Total Households: 400

Languages
  - Official: Punjabi
- Time zone: UTC+5:30 (IST)
- ISO 3166 code: IN-PB
- Website: jalandhar.gov.in

Nurpur is a village in Nakodar in Jalandhar district of Punjab State, India. It is located 12 kilometres (7.5 mi) from sub district headquarter and 30 kilometres (19 mi) from district headquarter. The village is administrated by a Sarpanch, an elected representative of the village.

== Demography ==
As of 2011, the village has a total number of 400 houses and a population of 1993 of which 998 are males while 995 are females. According to the report published by Census India in 2011, out of the total population of the village 846 people are from Schedule Caste and the village does not have any Schedule Tribe population so far.

== See also ==
- List of villages in India
