= Mundh =

- Village
- Location in Punjab, India Mundh (India)
- Coordinates: 31.192633°N 75.4745502°E
- Country: India
- State: Punjab
- District: Jalandhar
- Tehsil: Nakodar

Government
  - Body: Gram panchayat
- Elevation: 240 m (790 ft)

Population (2011)
  - Total: 2,068
- Sex ratio 1058/1010 ♂/♀

Languages
  - Official: Punjabi
- Time zone: UTC+5:30 (IST)
- PIN: 144630
- Telephone: 01821
- ISO 3166 code: IN-PB
- Vehicle registration: PB- 08
- Website: jalandhar.nic.in

Mundh is a village in Nakodar in Jalandhar district of Punjab State, India. It is located 8.8 kilometres (5.5 mi) from Nakodar, 33.8 kilometres (21.0 mi) from Kapurthala, 18 kilometres (11 mi) from district headquarter Jalandhar and 163 kilometres (101 mi) from state capital Chandigarh.

== Transport ==
Nakodar railway station is the nearest train station. The village is 68 kilometres (42 mi) away from domestic airport in Ludhiana and the nearest international airport is located in Chandigarh also Sri Guru Ram Dass Jee International Airport is the second nearest airport which is 114 kilometres (71 mi) away in Amritsar.
