= Saidupur =

- Village
- Location in Punjab, India Saidupur (India)
- Coordinates: 31.187381°N 75.4626265°E
- Country: India
- State: Punjab
- District: Jalandhar
- Tehsil: Nakodar

Government
  - Type: Panchayat raj
  - Body: Gram panchayat
- Elevation: 240 m (790 ft)

Population (2011)
  - Total: 464
- Sex ratio 231/233 ♂/♀

Languages
  - Official: Punjabi
- Time zone: UTC+5:30 (IST)
- ISO 3166 code: IN-PB
- Vehicle registration: PB- 08
- Website: jalandhar.nic.in

Saidupur is a village in Nakodar in Jalandhar district of Punjab State, India. It is located 9 kilometres (5.6 mi) from Nakodar, 33 kilometres (21 mi) from Kapurthala, 20 kilometres (12 mi) from district headquarter Jalandhar and 163 kilometres (101 mi) from state capital Chandigarh. The village is administrated by a sarpanch who is an elected representative of village as per Panchayati raj (India).

== Transport ==
Nakodar railway station is the nearest train station. The village is 70 kilometres (43 mi) away from domestic airport in Ludhiana and the nearest international airport is located in Chandigarh also Sri Guru Ram Dass Jee International Airport is the second nearest airport which is 114 kilometres (71 mi) away in Amritsar.
