= Bir Udhowal =

- Village
- Location in Punjab, India Bir Udhowal (India)
- Coordinates: 31.032763°N 75.4178802°E
- Country: India
- State: Punjab
- District: Jalandhar
- Tehsil: Nakodar

Government
  - Type: Panchayat raj
  - Body: Gram panchayat
- Elevation: 240 m (790 ft)

Population (2011)
  - Total: 175
- Sex ratio 87/88 ♂/♀

Languages
  - Official: Punjabi
- Time zone: UTC+5:30 (IST)
- PIN: 144041
- Telephone: 01821
- ISO 3166 code: IN-PB
- Vehicle registration: PB- 08
- Website: jalandhar.nic.in

Bir Udhowal is a village in Nakodar in Jalandhar district of Punjab State, India. It is located 15 km from Nakodar, 48 km from Kapurthala, 39 km from district headquarter Jalandhar and 162 km from state capital Chandigarh. The village is administrated by a sarpanch who is an elected representative of village as per Panchayati raj (India).

== Transport ==
Nakodar railway station is the nearest train station; however, Phillaur Junction train station is 39 km away from the village. The village is 68 km away from domestic airport in Ludhiana and the nearest international airport is located in Chandigarh also Sri Guru Ram Dass Jee International Airport is the second nearest airport which is 128 km away in Amritsar.
