= Gandhran =

- Village
- Location in Punjab, India Gandhran (India)
- Coordinates: 31.1168741°N 75.4182242°E
- Country: India
- State: Punjab
- District: Jalandhar
- Tehsil: Nakodar

Government
  - Type: Panchayat raj
  - Body: Gram panchayat
- Elevation: 240 m (790 ft)

Population (2011)
  - Total: 2,039
- Sex ratio 1026/1013 ♂/♀

Languages
  - Official: Punjabi
- Time zone: UTC+5:30 (IST)
- PIN: 144040
- Telephone: 01821
- ISO 3166 code: IN-PB
- Vehicle registration: PB- 08
- Website: jalandhar.nic.in

Gandhran is a village in Nakodar in Jalandhar district of Punjab State, India. It is located 6.8 km from Nakodar, 35 km from Kapurthala, 30 km from district headquarter Jalandhar and 169 km from state capital Chandigarh. As per constitution of India and Panchyati Raaj Act, Gandhran village is administrated by Sarpanch (Head of Village) who is elected representative of village.

== Population ==
The Gandhran village has population of 2039 of which 1026 are males while 1013 are females as per Population Census 2011. In Gandhran village population of children with age 0-6 is 232 which makes up 11.38% of total population of village. Average Sex Ratio of Gandhran village is 987 which is higher than Punjab state average of 895. Child Sex Ratio for the Gandhran as per census is 856, higher than Punjab average of 846.

Gandhran village has lower literacy rate compared to Punjab. In 2011, literacy rate of Gandhran village was 75.43% compared to 75.84% of Punjab. In Gandhran Male literacy stands at 79.47% while female literacy rate was 71.41%.

== Transport ==
Nakodar railway station is the nearest train station. Gandhran halt serves as the train stop for a few trains. The village is 69 km away from domestic airport in Ludhiana and the nearest international airport is located in Chandigarh also Sri Guru Ram Dass Jee International Airport is the second nearest airport which is 116 km away in Amritsar.
