= Nakodar (Rural) =

- Village
- Location in Punjab, India Nakodar (Rural) (India)
- Coordinates: 31°07′54″N 75°27′16″E
- Country: India
- State: Punjab
- District: Jalandhar
- Tehsil: Nakodar

Government
  - Type: Panchayat raj
  - Body: Gram panchayat

Area
  - Total: 2,080 ha (5,100 acres)

Population (2011)
  - Total: 481; 236/245 ♂/♀
  - Density: 23/km^{2} (60/sq mi)
  - Scheduled Castes: 352; 174/178 ♂/♀
  - Total Households: 88

Languages
  - Official: Punjabi
- Time zone: UTC+5:30 (IST)
- Telephone: 01821
- ISO 3166 code: IN-PB
- Website: jalandhar.gov.in

Nakodar (Rural) is a village in Nakodar in Jalandhar district of Punjab State, India. It is located 2 kilometres (1.2 mi) from sub district headquarter and 26 kilometres (16 mi) from district headquarter. The village is administrated by Sarpanch an elected representative of the village. Nakodar (Rural) is unique among surrounding villages as the geographical area of this village being 2,080 hectares (20.8 km^{2}), is very large for a scattered population of only 481 people. In contrast the adjoining Nakodar town area is 1,250 hectares (12.5 km^{2}).

== Demography ==
As of 2011, the village has a total number of 88 houses and a population of 481 of which 236 are males while 245 are females. According to the report published by Census India in 2011, out of the total population of the village 352 people are from Schedule Caste and the village does not have any Schedule Tribe population so far.

== See also ==
- List of villages in India
