= Bal Hukmi =

- Village
- Location in Punjab, India Bal Hukmi (India)
- Coordinates: 31.1234506°N 75.434457°E
- Country: India
- State: Punjab
- District: Jalandhar
- Tehsil: Nakodar

Government
  - Type: Panchayat raj
  - Body: Gram panchayat
- Elevation: 240 m (790 ft)

Population (2011)
  - Total: 513
- Sex ratio 267/246 ♂/♀

Languages
  - Official: Punjabi
- Time zone: UTC+5:30 (IST)
- PIN: 144040
- ISO 3166 code: IN-PB
- Vehicle registration: PB- 08
- Website: jalandhar.nic.in

Bal Hukmi is a village in Nakodar in Jalandhar district of Punjab State, India. It is located 4.5 km from Nakodar, 37.2 km from Kapurthala, 28.2 km from district headquarter Jalandhar and 149 km from state capital Chandigarh. Village Is famous for hand made Punjabi jutti for years. The village is administrated by a sarpanch who is an elected representative of village as per Panchayati raj (India).

== Transport ==
Nakodar railway station is the nearest train station; however, Phagwara Junction train station is 37.3 km away from the village. The village is 67 km away from domestic airport in Ludhiana and the nearest international airport is located in Chandigarh also Sri Guru Ram Dass Jee International Airport is the second nearest airport which is 112 km away in Amritsar.
