= Bhodipur =

- Village
- Location in Punjab, India Bhodipur (India)
- Coordinates: 31.123533°N 75.3832712°E
- Country: India
- State: Punjab
- District: Jalandhar
- Tehsil: Nakodar

Government
  - Type: Panchayat raj
  - Body: Gram panchayat
- Elevation: 240 m (790 ft)

Population (2011)
  - Total: 529
- Sex ratio 275/254 ♂/♀

Languages
  - Official: Punjabi
- Time zone: UTC+5:30 (IST)
- PIN: 144040
- ISO 3166 code: IN-PB
- Website: jalandhar.nic.in

Bhodipur is a village in Nakodar in Jalandhar district of Punjab State, India. It is located 8.6 km from Nakodar, 34 km from Kapurthala, 32 km from district headquarter Jalandhar and 163 km from state capital Chandigarh. The village is administrated by a sarpanch who is an elected representative of village as per Panchayati raj (India). Bhodipur is a very old village. Before partition it mainly had arain and jatt Muslims who migrated into the Bahawalnagar and Haroonabad, Bahawalnagar areas in Pakistan.

== Transport ==
Nakodar railway station is the nearest train station; however, Phagwara Junction train station is 41 km away from the village. The village is 72 km away from domestic airport in Ludhiana and the nearest international airport is located in Chandigarh also Sri Guru Ram Dass Jee International Airport is the second nearest airport which is 112 km away in Amritsar.
