= Nawan Pind Jattan =

Nawan Pind Jattan is a village in Nakodar tehsil of Jalandhar District in the Indian state of Punjab. The village is located 7 km from Nakodar and 32 km from the main district city of Jalandhar. The village contains all mixed faiths.
