= Nakodar =

- Town
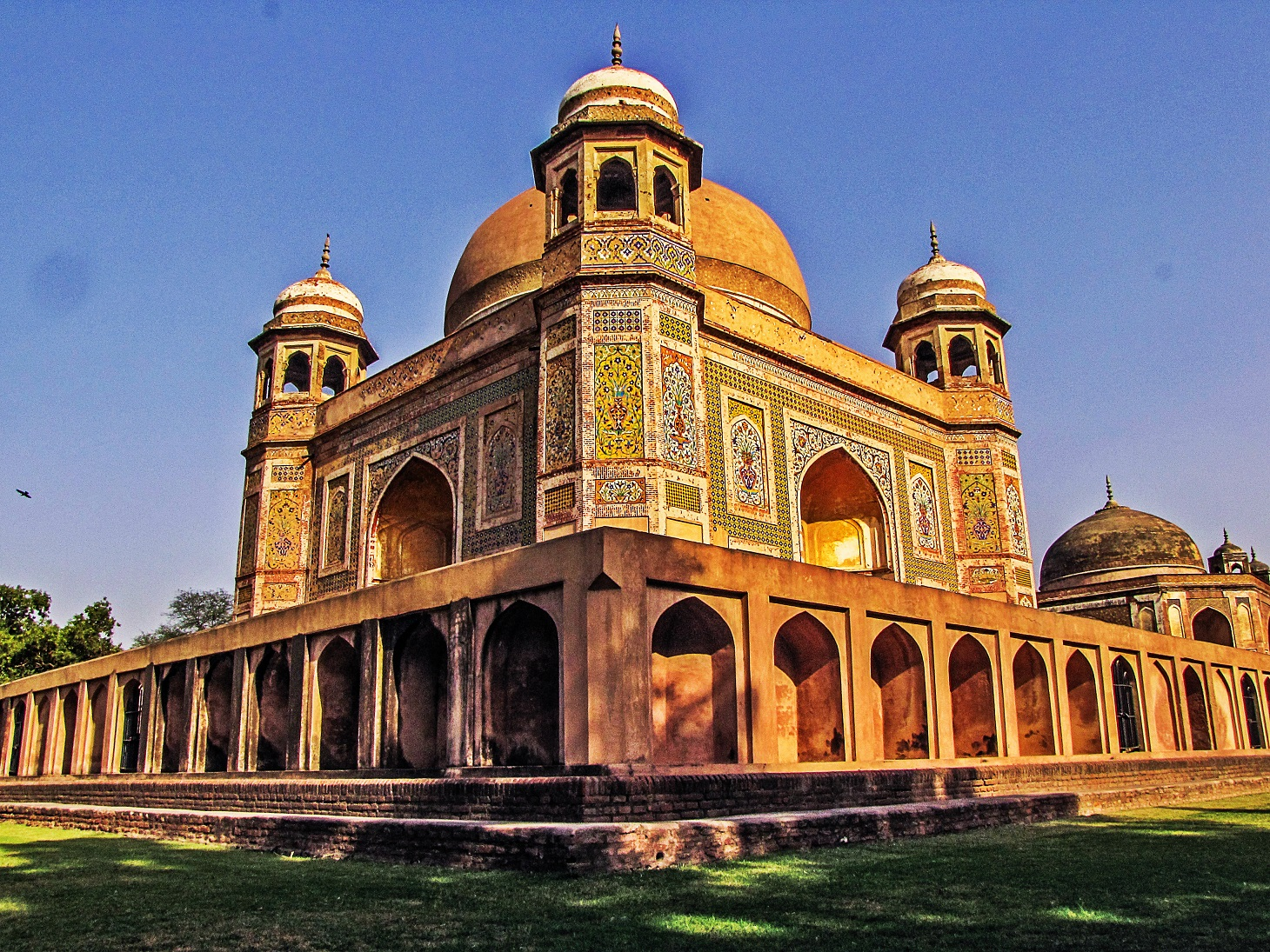
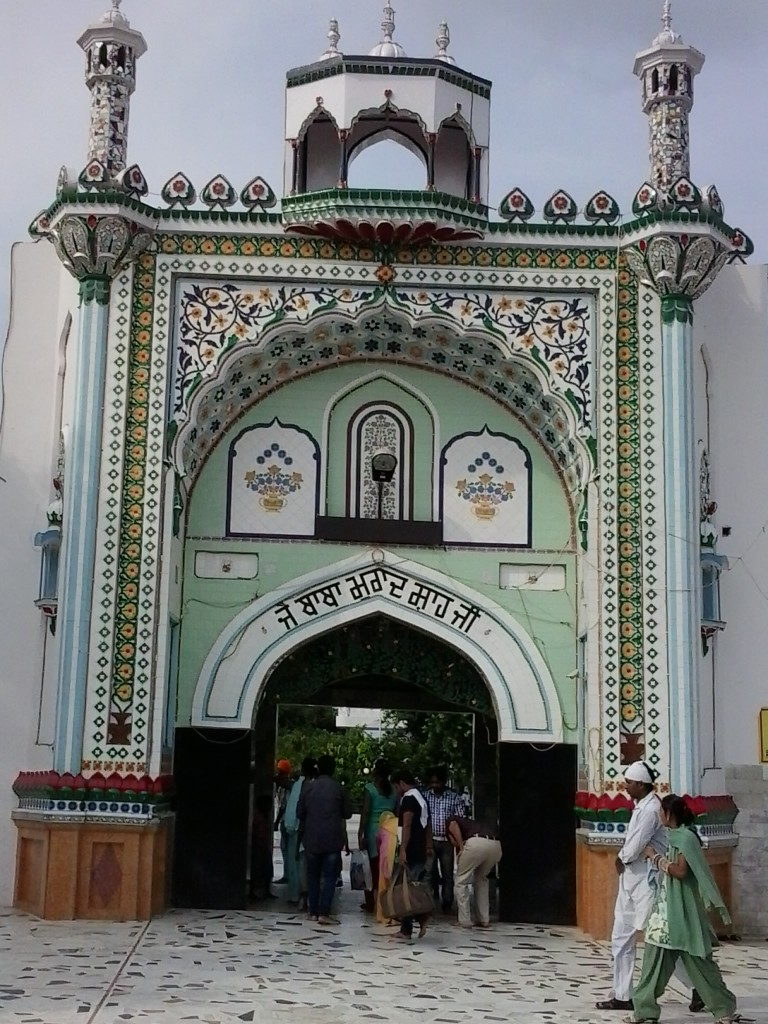
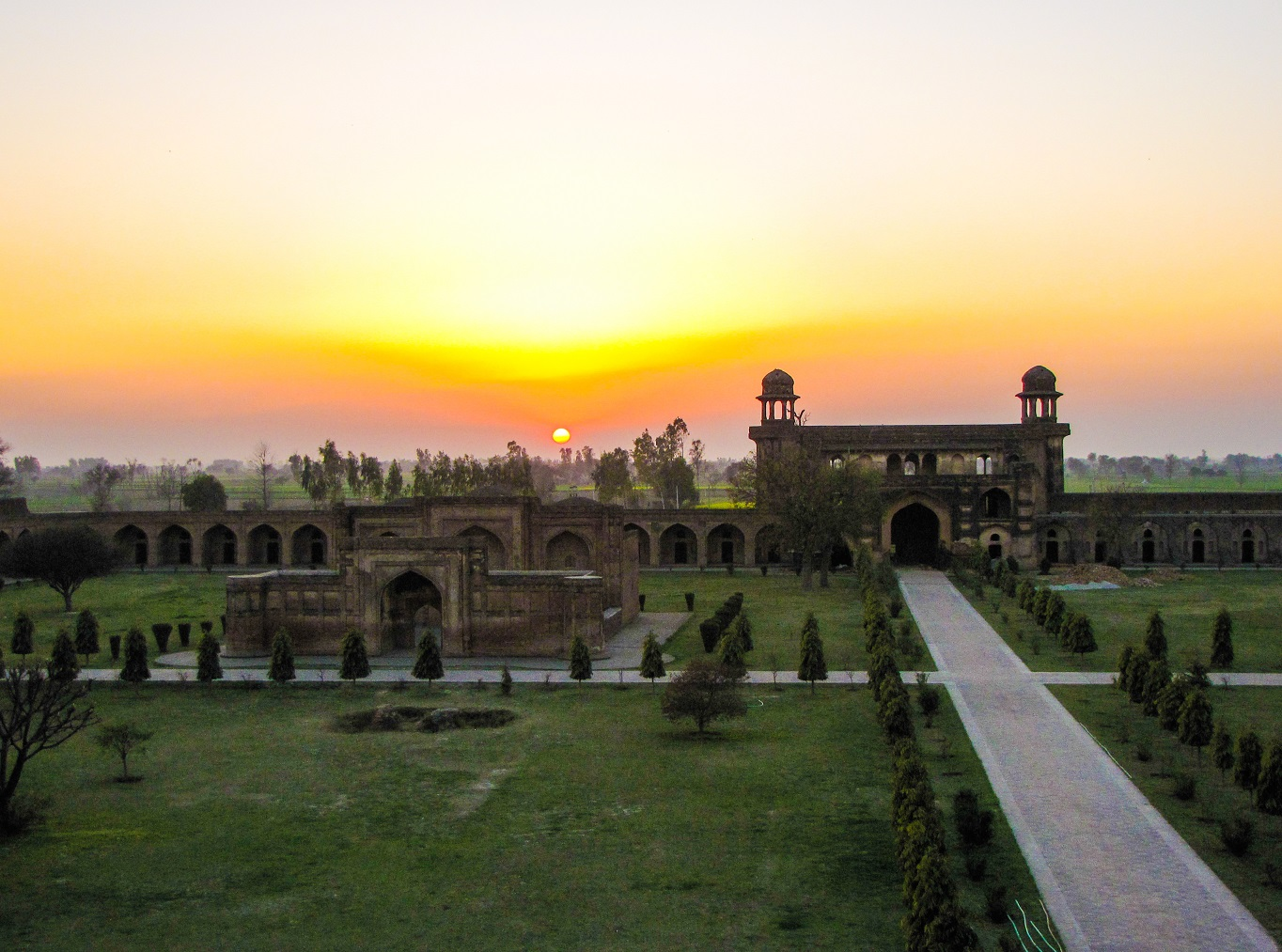
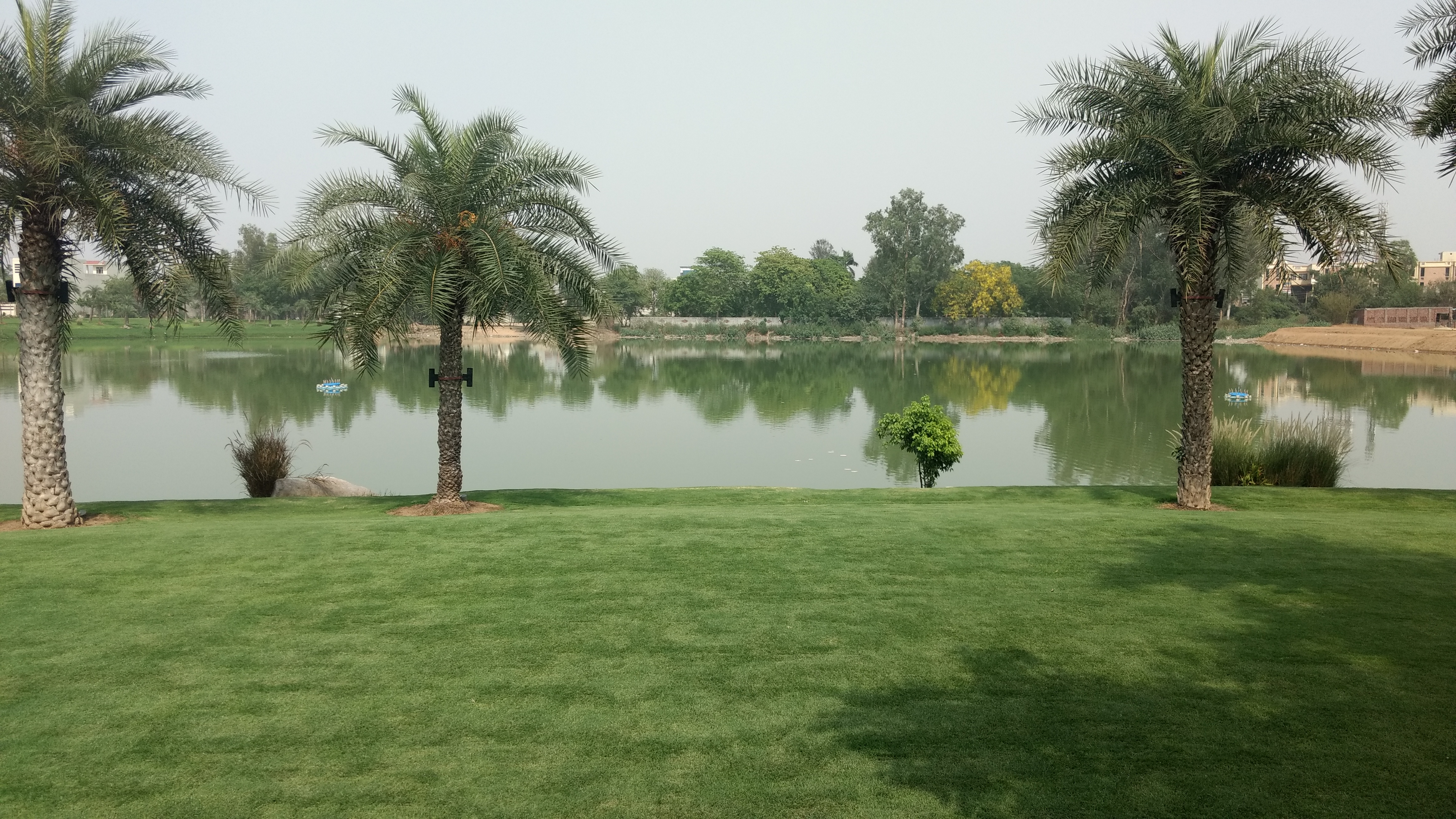
- Tombs of Ustad-Shagird, Nakodar, Dera Baba Murad Shah, Dakhni Sarai, Nakodar Park

- Location in Punjab, India
- Coordinates: 31°07′39″N 75°28′41″E
- Country: India
- State: Punjab
- District: Jalandhar

Area
  - Total: 12.50 km^{2} (4.83 sq mi)

Population (2011)
  - Total: 36,973
  - Density: 2,958/km^{2} (7,661/sq mi)

Languages
  - Official: Punjabi
- Time zone: UTC+5:30 (IST)
- PIN: 144040
- Vehicle registration: PB-33
- Website: jalandhar.nic.in/html/cities_towns_nakodar.htm

Nakodar is a town and a municipal council in Jalandhar district in the Indian state of Punjab.

The city is almost 365 km from Delhi, 25 km from Jalandhar, 49 km from Ludhiana, and about 101 km from Amritsar. Surrounding villages include Chak Mughlani, Maheru, Allowal, Mehatpur (Haripur) (Bhullar) Nawan Pind Jattan, Heran, Bir Pind, (Aulakh), Shankar, Nur Pur Chatha, Sarih, Malri, Khanpur Dhadda, Uggi, and Malhian Kalan.

The town is well paved and currently forms a Tehsil of District Jalandhar. Outside the town, there are two large tombs dating from the times of Emperor Jahangir, later one of them is said to be the burial place of the adviser of Emperor Shah Jahan, but it is not known who stand buried in the earlier tomb.

== Origin of name ==
The name Nakodar, according to one account, is a said to be derived from the Persian phrase Neki ka dar, which means "Gate of Goodness or Virtue”. According to another version, the town was so-named after Nikudari legion of the Mongols.

== History ==
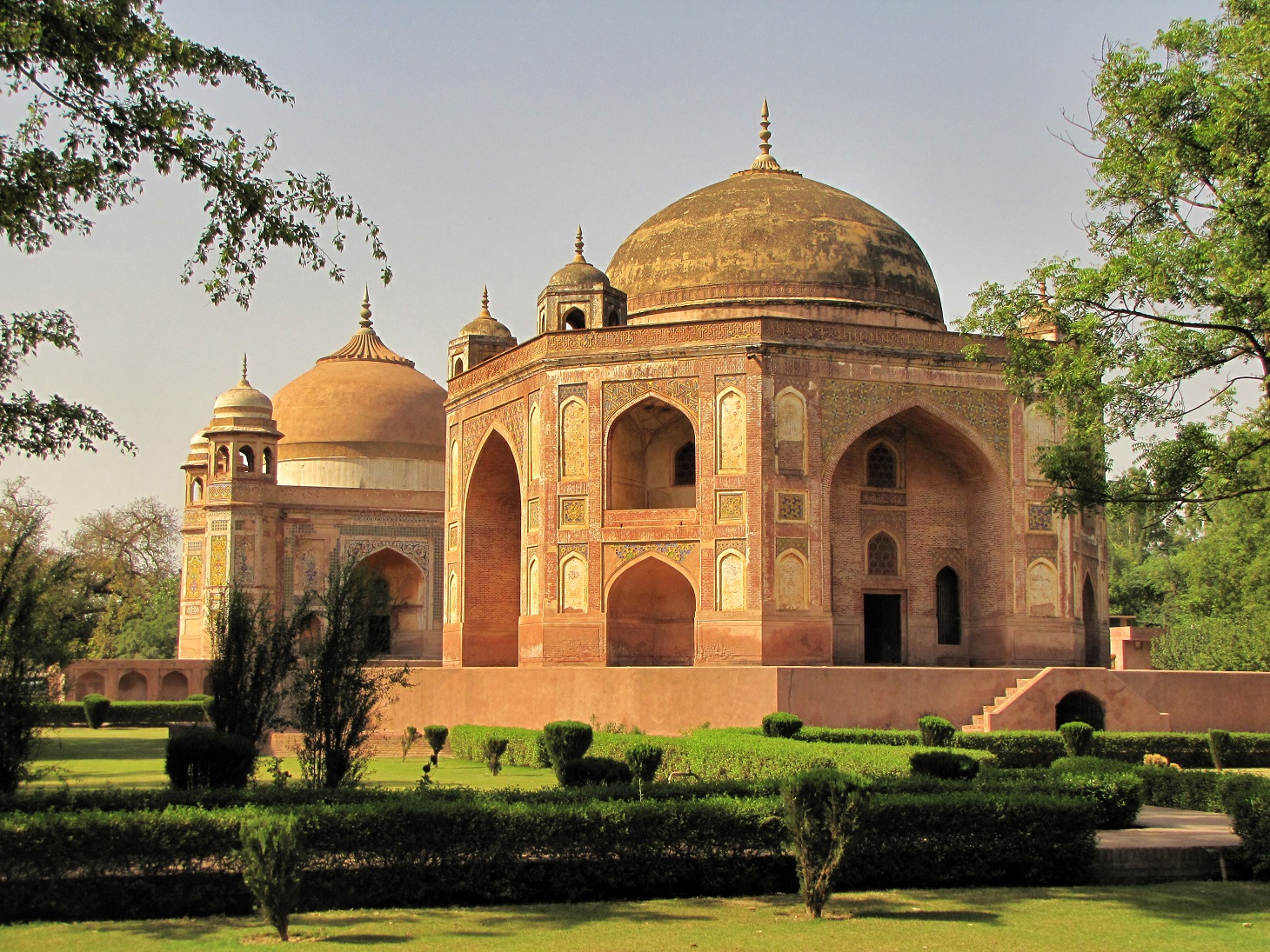
Tombs of Ustad in Nakodar

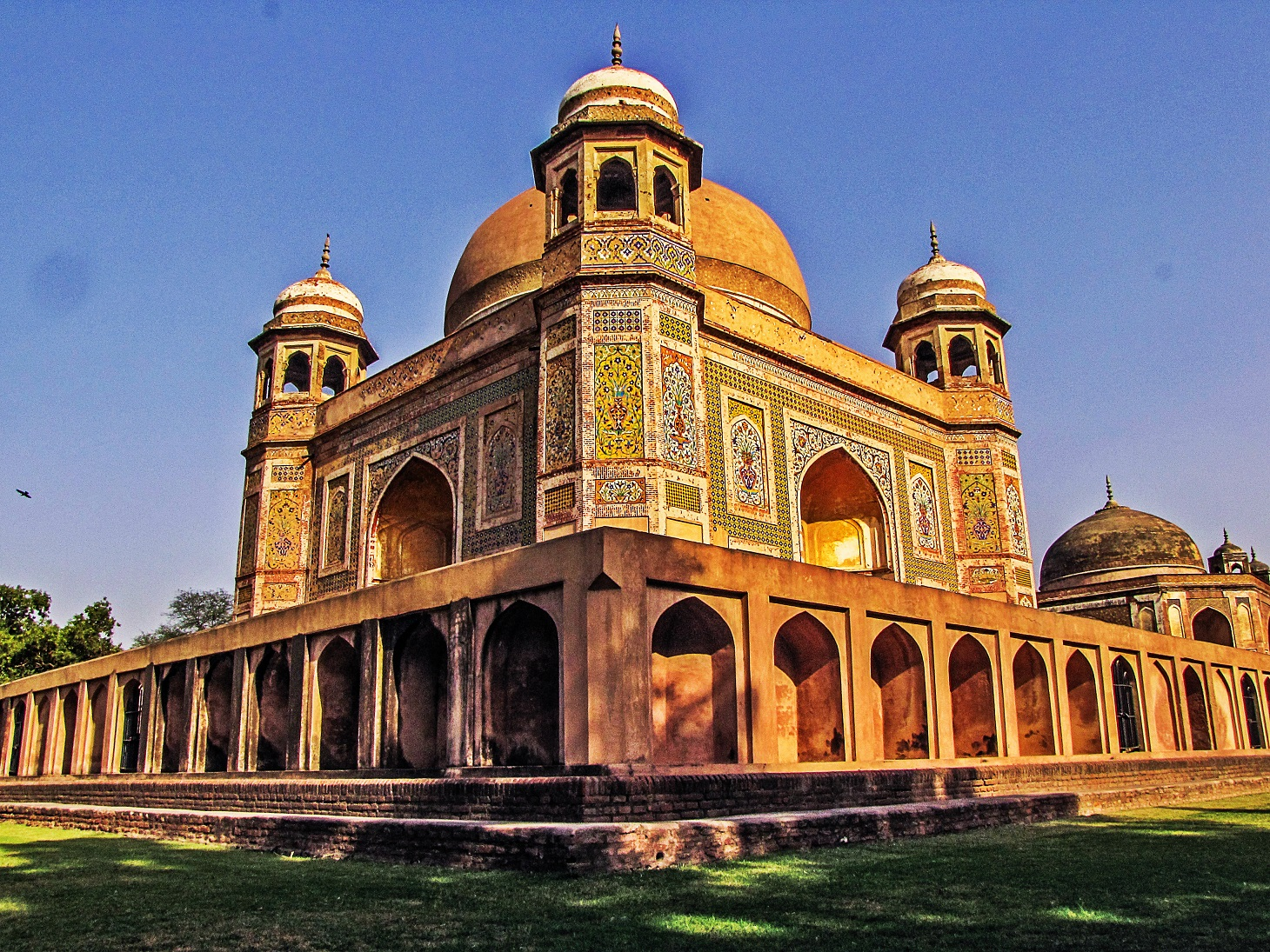
Tomb at Nakodar

The town is of considerable antiquity and had been held in succession by three different races, the Arain, Jatts, Kambojs, and then by the Muslim Rajputs, traces of whom still exist in the extensive ruins by which the town is surrounded. The town was anciently founded by the Hindu Kamboh, according to Sir William Wilson Hunter and others. The Kamboh settlements lay to the west of present town and the sites are still marked by extensive ruins and two old fine tombs, now called the Black and Red Domes, from the color of the material. Tradition attributes the Kamboh expulsion to the Nawab Kutb Khan who came with an army from Indor near Nuh in 1570 AD. As a consequence, the lordship of the town thus passed over to the Khanzadaas from the Kamboj tribe. Within two generations, the Rajputs got the town in jagir from Emperor Jahangir, in later sixteenth century, apparently divesting the Khanzadahs, the successor race to the Kambohs. The Rajputs were themselves later ousted during Sikh period by one Sardar Tara Singh Ghaiba who made a fort and made himself the master of the surroundings. From Ghaiba, the town was seized by Maharaja Ranjit Singh in 1816.

== Geography ==
Nakodar is located at 31.13°N 75.47°E. It has an average elevation of 223 metres (731 feet). Nakodar lies on Moga-Jalandhar section of National Highway 703 (NH 703).

== Demographics ==
In 2011 Indian Census, Nakodar municipal council had a total population of 36,973, of which 19,360 were males and 17,613 were females. Children in the age group of 0-6 were 3,843. The total number of literates in Nakodar was 27,836, which constituted 75.3% of the population with male literacy of 78.4% and female literacy of 71.9%. The effective literacy rate of 7+ population of Nakodar was 84.0%, of which male literacy rate was 87.4% and female literacy rate was 80.3%. The Scheduled Castes population was 13,492. Nakodar had 7,814 households in 2011.

As of the 2001 India census, Nakodar had a population of 31,422. Males constituted 53% of the population and females 47%. Nakodar had an average literacy rate of 73%, higher than the national average of 59.5%: male literacy is 77%, and female literacy was 69%.

== Transport ==
=== Rail ===
Nakodar town is well connected to major cities in Punjab through Nakodar Junction railway station which is a junction point for connection to railway stations at Jalandhar City, Phillaur and Lohian Khas.

== Notable people ==
- Satya Paul Agarwal, a neurosurgeon, academic, public health administrator, secretary general of the Indian Red Cross Society and recipient of Padma Bhushan award
- Amarjit Chandan, poet, writer
- Lehmber Hussainpuri, Indian born Bhangra singer
- Josh Malsiyani, Urdu poet
- Pash, poet
- Yuyutsu Sharma, Indian born Nepalese poet and journalist
- Malkit Singh, Indian born Bhangra singer

== See also ==
- List of villages in Nakodar tehsil
- Baba Lal Badshah
- Dera Baba Murad Shah
