= Babbar Akali movement =

Sikh political party and militant group in British India (1922–1924)

Babbar Akālī movement
- ਬੱਬਰ ਅਕਾਲੀ ਜੱਥਾ
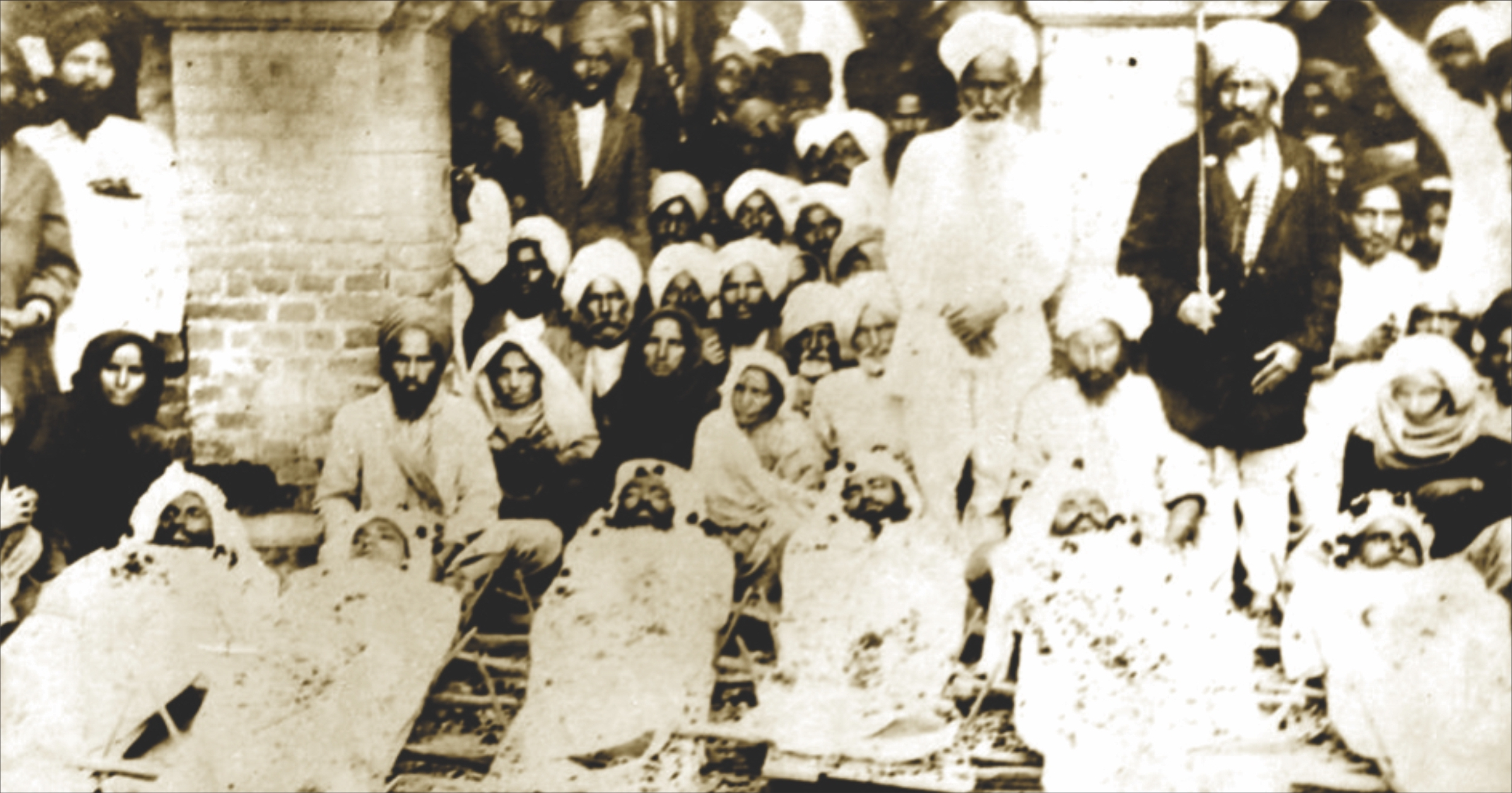
- Photograph of the six śahīd (martyr) leaders of the Babbar Akālī Jatthā executed on 27 February 1926
- Leaders: Jathedar Kishan Singh Gargajj; Master Mota Singh
- Dates active: August 1922–June 1924, with occasional decentralized activity into the 1940s
- Split from: Akali movement and Ghadar movement
- Newspaper: ਬੱਬਰ ਅਕਾਲੀ ਦੋਆਬਾ Babbar Akālī Doābā
- Active regions: Punjab Region
- Ideology: Independence from British rule
- Size: ~200
- Secretary - Dalip Singh Gosal

The Babbar Akālī movement was an outgrowth of the Akali movement, which campaigned for gurdwara reform during the early 1920s. Formed in 1922 from factions that splintered from the Akālīs in 1921, they differed from the Akālīs in their rejection of non-violence and embrace of armed revolt in the struggle against British rule.

== Formation ==
=== Impetus ===
The Akālī movement, which aimed to have Sikh shrines released from corrupt management, was nonviolent in character and strategy. During their campaigns, Akālīs would suffer physical injury and violence from mercenaries of priests and from government authorities. The deaths of Akālīs at Tarn Taran in January 1921 and Nankana Sahib in February 1921 would radicalize a faction, Babbar Akalis, that rejected nonviolence and adopted armed means in pursuit of their objectives.

=== First gatherings (March, May 1921) ===
The Babbar Akalis, as a breakaway wing, led by Master Mota Singh of Patara and Kishan Singh Gargajj, a retired havildar major of the 35th Sikhs, made its first formal appearance during the Sikh Educational Conference held at Hoshiarpur from 19-21 March, 1921.

During martial law in the Punjab, Binning had started delivering speeches against British rule while in the army, for which he was court-martialed and sentenced to 28 days confinement, after which he left the military and joined the Akali movement. It was for his speeches that he would earn the name gaṛgajj, or "thunderer". In a secret meeting, it was decided that the Nankana Sahib Massacre would be avenged.

Another meeting on 21 May 1921 was attended by Master Mota Singh, Kishan Singh Gargajj, Amar Singh Dhaliwal, Tota Singh Peshawari, Gurbachan Singh Ambala, Buttan Singh, Bijla Singh Patiala, Amar Singh of Kot Bare Khan, Chattar Singh Jethuwal, Bela Singh of Paragpur, Ganda Singh, and others, as well as a number of returned emigrants from Canada. Other included Sant Kartar Singh, Babu Santa Singh, and Sunder Singh. According to a CID report, their objectives were:

- To foment an uprising in Patiala State;
- To attempt contact with the Bolsheviks to synchronise an uprising across the North-West Frontier with that of Patiala;
- To foment trouble in Central Panjab;
- To recruit and gather arms; and
- To eliminate officials and individuals deemed enemies to the Khalsa.

Lahore Division Commissioner C.M. King, Superintendent of Police in the Intelligence department J.W. Bowring, Mahants Devi Das and Basant Das, Sunder Singh Majithia, and Kartar Singh Bedi (the nephew of Khem Singh Bedi) were held responsible for the Nankana massacre and were selected for assassination, as a lesson to collaborators and a message of defiance to the British.

=== Bowring attempt (May 1921) ===
Tota Singh Peshawari was sent to the North-West Frontier, where he was able to acquire a small collection of arms and ammunition. Bela Singh and Ganda Singh then visited Lahore on 23 May 1921 to assassinate Bowring, who was out of town that day. While at the Lahore railway station to return, they raised suspicion and were arrested by the police, to whom they divulged the plot under interrogation. As a result, many other members of the group including Amar Singh of Kot Bare Khan, Narain Singh, Tota Singh, Chattar Singh Kandhola, Chanchal Singh, Thakur Singh and Shankar Singh were arrested. Master Mota Singh, Kishan Singh, and Bijla Singh had managed to evade police; warrants were issued for their arrest as well as for Vatan Singh, Amar Singh of Delhi, and Gurbachan Singh.

The Akālī leadership, on learning about the plan to avenge Nankana, exhorted Sikhs not to associate themselves with such activities, and maintain the nonviolence policy of the SGPC, which issued communiqués to that effect. Nevertheless, despite the disawowal and arrests, the programme would continue. They would reject both the Akālī policy of passive suffering as unworkable, and the general Gandhian Congress strategy of non-violent non-cooperation as limiting the peasant struggle against imperialism. Appealing to Sikh martiality and deeming the Akālī approach as ineffective, they urged the people to resort to arms.

=== Public engagement ===
Building on the tentative plan of action, Kishan Singh announced a detailed programme in his speech at a Nimani mela held at Mastuana village in Jind State, during which he was interrupted by the organizer. Invoking the Zafarnama of Guru Gobind Singh, he declared that it was legitimate to resort to arms when peaceful means had failed. There, Karam Singh Babbar also recited the following poem:

Recited by Karam Singh Babbar
Punjabi	Roman transliteration	Translation
ਖੰਡਾ ਪਕੜੋ ਸ਼ੇਰੋ ਆਖੇ ਬੱਬਰ ਵੰਗਾਰ ਖੰਡਾ ਪਕੜ ਸਾਣ ਤੇ ਲਾਓ, ਤੇਜ ਕਰੋ ਦੋ ਧਾਰ ਬਿਨ ਖੰਡੇ ਨਾ ਮਿਲੇ ਅਜ਼ਾਦੀ, ਕਹਿੰਦਾ ਬੱਬਰ ਵੰਗਾਰ	khaṇḍā pakaṛo śero ākhe babbar vaṅgār khaṇḍā pakaṛ sāṇ te lāo, tej karo do dhār bin khaṇḍe nā mile āzādī kahindā babbar vaṅgār	Grab the double-edged sword, O lions, so the Babbar declares aloud, Grab it and put it on the whetstone, sharpen its two edges, Without the sword freedom is not received, declares the Babbar aloud.

The colonial bureaucracy was sought to be paralyzed by targeting its supporters (zaildars, safaidpośes ("white-collars"), lambardars, paṭwārīs (village registrars), informers and other collaborators) with various forms of punishment. Kishan Singh announced his programme of "reforming" those responsible for the Nankana massacre and other atrocities.

The Babbar programme would be centered on ਸੁਧਾਰ sudhār, or "reformation," a euphemism for the elimination of British officials and those deemed their stooges and lackeys, or ਝੋਲੀਚੁੱਕ jholīcukk, meaning "robe-bearer." Jholīcukks were the loyalist elements who were to be pressurized and frightened along with the officials, in the villages.

=== Composition ===
The movement had in its ranks many returned emigrants of the Ghadar Party, the prestige of which helped to popularize the Babbar jatthā. Such Ghadarites and emigrants included Karam Singh and Asa Singh. Like the Ghadarites, many Babbars similarly used 0.32 calibre revolvers and Mauser pistols, were believed to have established contact with revolutionary movements abroad, were believed by officials in Punjab to have been receiving funding for revolutionary propaganda from emigrants in the United States and Canada, and travelled throughout the province presenting their views to the populace. Also like the Ghadarites, the sphere of armed Akālī activity was mainly in Jalandhar district and Hoshiarpur district.

Besides them, the Babbars were chiefly retired and demobilized soldiers from World War I. Their time abroad had also exposed them to new ideas and an increasingly self-assured opposition to repressive British imperialism; with this exposure, many found it difficult to return to their traditional family occupation of farming. Many were disgruntled with the British for failing to receive land grants and other rewards in exchange for army service. The Babbars would also come to attract some groups of dacoits or bandits who were inspired to direct their activities towards a cause.

==== Cakkarvartī dals (November 1921) ====
Dissident Akālīs would organise themselves into cakkarvartī dals. In November 1921 at Rurka Kalan, Kishan Singh formed a cakkarvartī jatthā along with Sunder Singh Mukhsuspuri and Karam Singh Jhingar, which began to incite the peasantry and soldiery towards revolt, in Jalandhar district, with frequent incursions into the villages of Ambala and Kapurthala State. Karam Singh of Daulatpur, along with Asa Singh, organized a similar band in Hoshiarpur district, in which divans were convened daily in some villages by sympathizers, who was under arrest warrants for seditious speeches.

===== Meetings (early 1922) =====
Meetings were held at 1 p.m. and 9 p.m. daily at different villages, resting for the night at yet another village to evade police detection; Kishan Singh Gargajj delivered speeches and Sundar Singh recited revolutionary poetry. In 1922 more meetings were held, in Bolina, Bhojowal, Kotli, Pindori Nijjran, Ramgarh Jandala, Mahilpur, Jiani, Bari Kalan, Sirhala, Bedowal, and Jassowal, in Jalandhar and Hoshiarpur districts, and occasionally at Anandpur Sahib and Kiratpur Sahib. They would also use Akali and Congress meetings to rally people to abandon nonviolence, which was seen as cowardly, including at Khurdpur in March 1922. Their conference at Kot Fatuhi was especially large compared to previous ones, demonstrating their growing influence.

In May 1922, Kishan Singh, Babu Santa Singh and Bela Singh met with soldiers Kirpal Singh Malakpur, Partap Singh Sialkot, Ganga Singh Naik, and other soldiers of 52nd Sikhs at Sant Kartar Singh's hermitage in Jalandhar, who agreed to spread their message and acquire ammunition for them. Kishan Singh and Santa Singh also met students at Khalsa High School in Jalandhar, who offered their services but were told to continue their studies until appropriate. As they continued to spread their message, Sunder Singh was arrested by the people of Sundh village on 11 May 1922, after which Kishan Singh's jatthā attacked its first informer, safaidpoś zaildār Harnam Singh of Mehndipur.

The decision to punish jholīcukks was only taken when the government declared rewards for these rogue Akālīs, incentivising informants upon whom warnings were not effective, and who had begun to discourage people from attending their meetings. On 19 March 1922 a conference was held at Sangowal, which was under heavy police surveillance, where jholīcukks created a disturbance and summoned the police, upon which the Babbars escaped to a well. Afterwards, Kishan Singh, Sunder Singh, Babu Santa Singh, Kartar Singh of Gondpur and Harbans Singh of Sirhala Khurd met at a well between Beas and Sangowal, where it was decided that Babbars should always be armed and jholīcukks punished, starting with notorious ones like Harnam Singh and zaildār Sham Singh of Talhan.

==== Merging jatthās (August 1922) ====
Towards the end of August 1922, the various jatthās convened for a general meeting at Sant Thakar Singh's hermitage at Gajowal and merged to officially form the Babbar Akālī Jatthā. A regular working committee was elected to work out a plan of action and collect arms and ammunition. Kishan Singh was chosen as the leader or jathedar, Dalip Singh Gosal as Secretary, and Baba Santa Singh as Treasurer; nominated members included Master Dalip Singh Daulatpur, Karam Singh Jhingar (assistant to the leaders) and Ude Singh Ramgarh Jhuggian (assistant to the leaders), as well as Karam Singh Daulatpur (assistant to the leaders), Assa Singh of Phakarudi, and Atma Singh of Bika. Contacts were sought with active soldiers and students; Kishan Singh canvassed Sikh soldiers at Jalandhar Cantonment seeking to obtain arms and ammunition. Some important Babbar leaders were placed in charge of various Jatthās to organise conferences in different parts of the Panjab and the Sikh States.

The term babbar means "lion", while the historical Akālī was the military order of the Sikhs known as the Akālīs, also known as The Immortals or Nihangs, who under the Sikh Empire had been led by the fiercely anti-British Akali Phula Singh, who also served as a mentor and close advisor in the court of Maharaja Ranjit Singh.

== Preparation ==
=== Rallying support ===
The Babbar leaders, ascribing the failure of the Ghadar movement to lack of popular awareness and support, sought to inform and enlist the rural population for their cause before taking action. In November 1921, he met Bhai Sunder Singh Makhsuspuri and Karam Singh Jhingar while in Doaba, and they would form two initial jatthās to travel throughout the province to this end. Religious diwans, or assemblies, were organized, and cyclostyled leaflets were distributed among villagers, who formed the majority of the participants in the Babbar movement, which was greatly sustained by the contempt among Sikh peasantry for British imperialism and its supporters as well as for moneylenders, attacks on whom were driven by economic grievances caused by their exploitation.

==== Babbar Akālī Doābā (August 1922) ====
The founding meeting also decided to start a cyclostyled paper called ਬੱਬਰ ਅਕਾਲੀ ਦੋਆਬਾ Babbar Akālī Doābā, which spoke of foreign exploitation, the desperate economic conditions of the peasantry and the need to expel the British by force. It also drew the attention of the Sikh peasantry in particular to the futility of Akālī passivity. According to an official report, the paper "exhorted the Akālīs to abandon the nonviolent doctrines of the SGPC, and called upon them to revolt, to kill the foreigners and to establish a free Government...." and "incited the soldiers to murder their European Officers".

The paper began appearing as a monthly starting in September 1922. Karam Singh Daulatpur, as the editor, was asked to prepare a list of police informers, collaborators and other Government agents to penalise. His jatthā had robbed lambaṛdār Kaka Singh of Bachhauri on 3 July of government revenue of Rs. 575, which was used to purchase arms and a cyclostyle. Published with the name of Safarī Press ("wandering press") for the first few issues, then under Uḍārū Press ("flying press"), it was duplicated at Gurdwara Kishanpur, Fatehpur Kotli, Jasowal, Kot Fatuhi and Pindori, and distributed free of charge. Another machine would be purchased to keep up with demand.

==== First rewards for arrests ====
In response to Babbar dissemination, the Government set up associations organised by jholīcukks. Aman Sabhas, or "peace councils," and "Sudhār Committees," composed of lambaṛdārs, safaidpośes, zaildārs, were organized in villages to counteract Babbar influence. These committees characterized British rule in Punjab as a blessing to the villagers, and the British as blessed by the Sikh gurus. They exhorted the villagers not to trust Babbar literature and to help the government in apprehending them; villagers suspected of harboring sympathies for the Babbar cause were harassed and intimidated. Khan Bahadur CID Deputy Superintendent Mir Fazil Imam was sent by the DIG to Jalandhar, where he reported the seriousness of the situation in Doaba and the atmosphere of fear among jholīcukks. As a result, in an emergency conference on November 1922 at Jalandhar attended by C.W. Jacob of the ICS, Deputy Commissioner F.C. Isemonger, and Mir Fazal Imam, stricter measures against the Babbars were formulated and higher rewards for arrests announced on 30 November:

- Kishan Singh Gargaj: Rs. 2,000
- Karam Singh Daulatpur: Rs. 1,000
- Karam Singh Jhingar: Rs. 500
- Dalip Singh Gohgal: Rs. 500
- Assa Singh: Rs.250

Police stations were set up in every village to collect more information from jholīcukks and widen their network.

=== Programme established (December 1922) ===
Despite the Akālī disavowal of the programme and the SGPC's exhortations, the movement attracted a significant following from the rural Sikh population of Doaba. As a result, Jatthedār Kishan Singh convened the Babbar jatthās on 25 December 1922 at Jassowal village, attended by prominent members including Dalip Singh, Karam Singh, and Santa Singh, where he declared the timing and atmosphere in the region favorable to implement the Babbar programme, as well to forestall British attempts at sabotage. The decision was published in the next issue of the Babbar Akālī Doābā.

Another meeting of the general body was soon held there on 30-31 December, in which the working committee announced the following decisions:

- The working committee alone could decide when and by whom a target would be eliminated. Members were not in indulge in personal vendettas, or to initiate an action arbitrarily, though if a member came across a collaborator by chance, it was advisable to assassinate them after considering carefully;
- Cash and goods of collaborators were not to be lifted unless expressly permitted by the working committee, in which case it was all to be passed on to the jatthās’ common fund to purchase necessary arms, not for personal needs.
- While members were forbidden to touch the belongings of innocents, it was considered permissible to loot the property of the Government and notorious moneylenders.
- Children of collaborators were not to be touched, nor their women insulted or molested during the course of a Babbar action;
- Only those who could freely execute the orders of the working committee could be members of Babbar jatthās. Those with family encumbrances and other engagements were advised not to join as full members, but to help as sympathizers.
- The earlier decision of chopping off the noses and ears of collaborators was replaced by the new decision to assassinate them, as the former took longer and could be used to turn public sentiment against them;
- Every assassination was to be announced in a special leaflet with the names of the Babbars responsible.

The members were to regularly recite gurbani, or Sikh scripture. In order to evade police detection and conceal their activities, they developed a secret code. The total number of Babbars barely exceeded 200; even members did not know the exact number. The outer circle of the jatthā consisted of sympathizers who fed and sheltered active members, relayed messages for leaders, arranged divans for itinerant speakers, and distributed leaflets.

In one leaflet, the Babbars made the following appeal to the people of Doābā:

As the Indian movement has subsided, the Tenth Guru has, therefore, in his infinite mercy, sent the Babbar to help the nation out of its critical situation. The Babbar will make his appearance in the Doaba where the Sikh army stands drawn up in battle array. He will expose the secret of the Feringhees who will shriek with pain.

The paper further called upon readers to:

bring about anarchy by means of (double-edged sword), cut down the foreigner and purge the land of sinful deeds... and burn the police stations, plunder the treasuries, place gun powder under the railway lines, raid the magazines, steal arms and sing the song of liberty.

The paper also called upon Hindus and Muslims to join the Khalsa in their struggle.

== Activities ==
The movement was especially active from mid-1922 to the end of 1923.

In addition to setting rules and plans, the 25 December meeting also decided the first target of the Babbars, a paṭwārī of Haripur named Arjan Singh, who was believed to have aided in the arrest of Master Mota Singh. This action was unsuccessful, however, and the first actual victim of the Babbars was zaildār Bishan Singh, a retired official of the Canal Department, who was shot dead on 10 February 1923. Three days later, another supporter of the British, Diwan Singh of Hayatpur was assassinated.

The assassination and the Babbar programme alarmed the authorities, who sent more spies into villages, reassured loyalists of full support, and announced rewards for the arrests of Babbar leaders. Lambaṛdars were instructed to immediately inform the police if a Babbar his location was discovered. After the murder of zaildār Bishan Singh, the police unleashed a wave of repression in Doaba, arresting between five to seven hundred innocent Sikh villagers daily. On 22 February, a Babbar meeting was held at the home of Hardit Singh of Jassowal, where it was decided that the Babbars would announce the names of zaildār's assassins, and individual Babbars would take credit for assassinations to spare villagers from police brutalities, which was finalized on 22 March with the presence of Karam Singh Daulatpur. Four days later, Kishan Singh Gargajj was arrested on information supplied by an informer, Kabul Singh Binning, in a raid at Pindari Mahal village.

=== March 1923 ===
Official measures against the Babbars escalated in 1923, including police raids at Pindori, Kishanpura, Jassowal, Paragpur, Bika, Rajowal, Kot Fatuhi and Daulatpur, and the arrests of leading Babbars like Kishan Singh on 26 February, Master Mota Singh and Sunder Singh, through tips or betrayals, Assa Singh on 1 March, Amar Singh of Kot Fatuhi on 26 March, Karam Singh Jhingar, and Dalip Singh Gosal on 5 January. Babbar activity would also escalate.

On the night of 2 March 1923, Babu Santa Singh, Banta Singh Dhamian, Sadhu Singh, and Banta Singh Paragpur attacked Jamsher railway station, where stationmaster Chanan Ram and Jamadar Sapuran Singh were falsely charging money from passengers and collaborating with the British. Having previously warned them, the Babbars entered the booking office and their homes, though only obtaining Rs. 30, and they were warned again.

On 11 March 1923, lambaṛdār Buta Singh and his grandson Surjan Singh were shot in Nangal Shama. In this case, while Buta Singh was a CID collaborator who had gotten rich being so, and had proudly collected certificates from government officers, the killing of Surjan Singh and the injury of a Ram Chand in the process was disapproved by the Babbars, who forbade those responsible from entering homes in the future, and relegated them to serving as lookouts.

On 19 March, Labh Singh, an ex-mistrī of the Police Training School, Phillaur who was believed to have aided in Kishan Singh's arrest, was shot dead in Hoshiarpur district. The Babbars claimed credit for these assassinations in an open letter to the governor issued in 22 March, threatening the same for other jholīcukks.

Three attempts were made on Kabul Singh Binning on 14, 17 and 23 March, who escaped each time.

On 22 March, at a meeting at Thakar Singh's hermitage, Karam Singh Daulatpur, Udey Singh and Dhanna Singh Behbalpur claimed the murders up to that point in the letter. It was also decided that no Babbar would offer himself for arrest alive. Copies of the letter were sent to Jalandhar Deputy Commissioner Diwan Durga Das and Minister of Kapurthala State Mian Sahib, and pasted in Pindori Nijjaran and other villages.

On the morning of 27 March, Hazara Singh of Behbalpur was shot, euphemistically reported in the Babbar Akālī Doābā on 14 April as having been given a reward of three "squares of land" (bullets).

=== April–May 1923 ===
==== Akali bargain ====
Like the Akālī leaders and the SGPC, national leaders like Mahatma Gandhi also disapproved of the Babbars as deviating from their policy of nonviolence towards the government. Gandhi had described them as "misguided patriots" and asserted that Babbar assassinations were not acts of heroism. Such stances would encourage British repression of the movement and execution of its leaders.

Following the first successful Babbar assassination of zaildār Bishan Singh, the government cracked down on the Akali movement, initially not differentiating between the mainstream Akalis and the Babbars, until atrocities began to radicalize nonviolent Sikhs against the government. The government then changed course, beginning to distinguish the two groups, and attempting to assure the Akalis that only seditious Sikhs that renounced non-violence were subject to such measures. Akali leaders warned would such measures against mainstream Akalis would push Sikhs further away from nonviolence and demanded a change in policy, which was accepted by the government, under the condition that the SGPC openly condemn the Babbars, and which released prisoners of the Guru-ka-Bagh morcha on 25 April. In return, the SGPC passed a resolution advising Sikhs and Akālī jatthās to disassociate from and refrain from helping those who had abandoned nonviolence.

Seeing this bargain, Babbar leaders like Master Mota Singh, and the nascent Naujawan Sabha charged the SGPC with "giving a green signal to the Panjab Government for the execution of the Babbar Akalis," allowing them a free hand in dealing with Babbar trials, sentences, and executions in exchange for the release of Akālī prisoners.

==== Declared unlawful ====
In April 1923, the Babbars were declared an unlawful association under the Criminal Law (Amendment) Act of 1908. The Government then took measures in response to Babbar activity.

On 17 April, retired subedar Gainda Singh Pawar was shot dead in front of his house in Ghurial for actively helping the police arrest Babbars, as well as making the locals of Ghurial bear the expenses for the police established there, as president of the village "peace council".

Between 20–22 April, arrests included Batan Singh, Sadhu Singh and Milkha Singh from Pandori, Hari Singh and Labh Singh from Jassowal, Bela Singh and Sadhu Singh from Paragpur, Ujjagar Singh Birampur, Sunder Singh Kot Fatuhi, Gurbachan Singh Sadhara, Sant Mit Singh Kishanpura and Nand Singh Ghurial.

On 25 April, the government announced a reward of six squares of land to anyone aiding the arrests of the Babbars involved in the murders of zaildār Bishan Singh, lambaṛdār Buta Singh, mistrī Labh Singh, safaidpoś Hazara Singh and subedār Gainda Singh.

More arrests would occur during the following weeks: Waryam Singh of Kot Fatuhi, Shiv Singh of Haripur and Amar Singh of Pindori Nijjaran on 27 April, Dalip "Dalipa" Singh of Dhamian on 28 April, Piara Singh of Dhamian on 1 May, and Sant Thakar Singh Rajowal and Banta Singh of Paragpur were arrested on 5 May. Thakar Singh, Harnam Singh of Pandori Nijjran, and Atma Singh of Bika were arrested on 6 May, and Prem Singh of Paragpur on 12 May.

On 12 May 1923 Karam Singh of Manko was arrested at Jalandhar Railway Station with the help of Anup Singh of Manko, informer of the police. According to the Akālī-te-Pardesī newspaper of Amritsar on 15 May, there were 21 arrests.

On 15 May, under a new commissioner, a joint force of military and special police was created to seize Babbars sheltering themselves in the Sivalik Hills. CID staff was deputed to assist the local police in arresting Babbar leaders, with a force of 50 regular police moved to Jalandhar. Units of a specially assembled force including 250 infantry and 50 cavalry were stationed at strategic points in active areas, accompanied by magistrates and a squadron of armored fighting vehicles. Airplanes were flown over the affected areas every two weeks scattering propaganda leaflets to restore morale among the loyalist elements in the countryside. A punitive police tax was imposed upon, and disciplinary action taken against, civil and military pensioners who harbored or sympathized with Babbars.

These measures helped in curbing the movement, and along with arrests and deaths of Babbars in police encounters, would deplete its ranks.

=== Summer 1923 ===
On 27 May, Chaudhari Ralla Ram and his brother Ditta of Kaulgarh village, Hoshiarpur District, who were CID and police informers, were assassinated by a team composed of Karam Singh Daulatpur, Dhanna Singh of Behbalpur, Udey Singh Ramgarh, Banta Singh Dhamian, Dalip Singh Dhamian, Babu Santa Singh, Anup Singh of Manko, Dhanna Singh of Kotli Bawa Das, and Bishan Singh of Magat, Ludhiana.

Sūbedār Sunder Singh Randhawa, who had enrolled five people, including his son, as special constables against the Babbars, was targeted nest, but managed to escape. Paṭwārī Atta Muhammad of Nanda Chaur, an informer, was assassinated on 6 June by Banta Singh, Dalip Singh Dhamian, and Dhanna Singh of Kotli Bawa Das. On 15/16 July, Bishan Singh of Sandhara escaped with serious injuries.

==== Police response ====
The spate of assassinations alarmed both authorities and loyalist elements, with an official account relaying that "a number of village officials and other loyalists were in fear for their lives and many of them expressed anxiety to resign their posts." On the advice of the Deputy Commissioner of Jalandhar, the DIG of Police deputed Khan Bahadur Sheikh Abdul Aziz, CID Superintendent of Police, to work in liaison with the Jalandhar police to pacify the area. In the report that Abdul Aziz sent to the CID DIG, he wrote a detailed account of the assassinations, emphasizing the panic they had created in the villages. On the Kaulgarh assassinations, he wrote

"The most surprising fact in the outrage is that while the culprits stayed for about 11 hours and in the early part of the night when the whole village comprising of about 100 houses was awake, not a single man came forward to the rescue of the victims, the neighbours shutting themselves in the houses. This was, I believe, due to the panic which had been created by the appearance of the desperate and notorious gang, some of whom were armed with firearms.”

Authorities issued weapons licenses, and prepared a list of suspected Babbar supporters. Undeterred by the arrests and deaths of leaders, the Babbar programme continued. The guerillas' considerable support from the local peasantry was evidenced by their ease of operation and the general lack of local cooperation with police. Repressive measures against sympathizers in Doaba bolstered their argument against the inefficacy of Akālī nonviolence. Babbar Akālī Doābā continued inciting soldiers to assassinate their officers and the populace to target the foreigners and establish a free government.

=== Further activity ===
Babbar assassinations and threats in their publications alarmed London, where MPs expressed concerns regarding law and order in Panjab and the safety of officials there. The Panjab Government was criticized for perceived laxity and reducing police numbers.

On 4 June 1923, Charles Yate, describing the Babbar programme to the House of Commons, sought a government statement on the Punjab situation. A motion was again tabled on 14 June in the British Parliament regarding the Babbars, but was shelved by the Secretary of State of India for lack of sufficient information on it, other than fortnightly reports on the Punjab situation sent to London, and on the grounds that Babbar activities, which would be the basis of judicial proceedings against them, would in the meantime not be commented upon. He sent an urgent telegram requested a detailed history of the movement. He would try to allay fears over the safety of Europeans in Punjab by quoting anti-Babbar measures implemented by the Punjab Government in one of their letters, and suggesting more active steps against the Babbars. The Government would adopt more such measures.

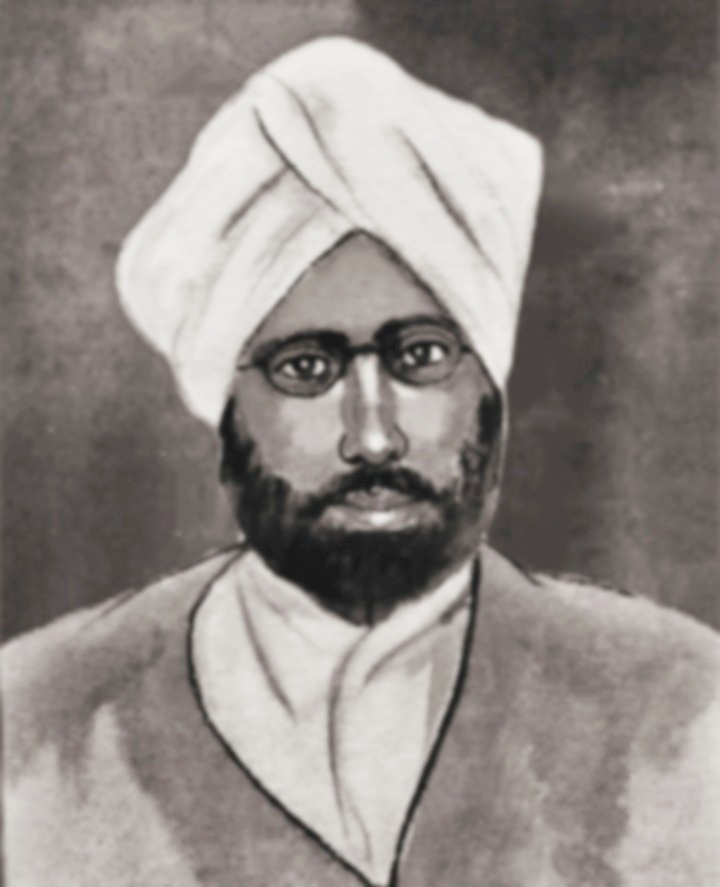
Martyr Kishan Singh Gargaj

In the second week of June 1923, Babu Santa Singh, Dalip Singh Dhamian, Banta Singh Dhamian, Anup Singh Manko and Dhanna Singh of Kotli Bawa Dass hid out in Malwa. Babu Santa Singh was arrested at Tapa Railway Station on 20 June by Mir Fazal Imam, on the basis of information from Sant Kartar Singh. Documents were recovered from Babu Santa Singh, including a letter, addressed to Jawala Singh and Bhagwan Singh of Fatehpur Kothi in Hoshiarpur, which referred to the Uḍārū Press cyclostyle. Bhagwan Singh was arrested, and the cyclostyle confiscated, in a resulting raid in the village, while Jawala Singh escaped.

Babu Santa Singh himself turned state's evidence under custody, with nine other Babbars arrested with his information, including Banta Singh Behbalpur on 28 August, Milkha Singh Moranwali, Besant Singh of Randhawa Masandan, Chhaja Singh Masanian, and Bawa Singh and Udham Singh of Pindori Nijjran on 1 September, Munsha Singh Johal on 4 September, Amar Singh Rajowal 6 September, Partap Singh Sialkot on 7 September, Wattan Singh Ganeshpur and Thakar Singh Bharta on 9 September 1923. Arrested Babbars were subjected to physical tortures, some of whom as a result disclosing information and statements about other Babbars and their movements.

On 8 August, the Government issued a third proclamation for arrests of fugitive Babbars, with the following rewards:

- Karam Singh Daulatpur: Rs. 3000
- Udey Singh of Ramgarh: Jhuggian Rs. 2000
- Dhanna Singh Behbalpur: Rs. 2000
- Banta Singh Dhamian: Rs. 1000
- Dalip Singh Dhamian: Rs. 1000
- Waryam Singh Dhugga: Rs. 1000
- Dhanna Singh Kotli Bawa Dass: Rs. 500
- Anup Singh Manko: Rs. 500
- Bishan Singh Mangat: Rs. 400
- Buta Singh Pindori Nijjaran: Rs. 200

Through informers, Buta Singh Pindori was arrested on 14 August. Other arrests included Kirpal Singh Malakwal on 18 September, Narain Singh Chattiwind on 19th October, and Man Singh Gujranwala on October 26.

Important Babbar hideouts at Pandori Nijran, Kishanpur, Jassowal, Paragpur, Kot Fatuhi and Daulatpur were located and raided, resulting in 186 arrests, including 25 of those suspected of complicity in murders. From the collected information and statements, police were able to trace and arrest remaining Babbar leaders, including Babu Santa Singh and Dalip Singh Dhamian.

=== Saboteurs ===
In addition, monetary rewards were announced to further incentivize quick arrests of Babbar leaders, and jagirs and money were promised in exchange for useful information from their relations, cooperating with whom certain Babbars were induced to become informers, including the cases of Anup Singh and Jawala Singh.

==== Anup Singh Manko ====
On 31 August 1923, Karam Singh Daulatpur, Udai Singh of Rampur Jhuggian, Bishan Singh Mangat, Mohinder Singh of Pindori, Ganga Singh, and Anup Singh Manko were travelling from Domeli to stay at Babeli for the afternoon. Anup Singh Manko, a recent Babbar entrant, was swayed by gold and the influence of his wife and family, and informed the police of their location, having destroyed the party’s ammunition with the exception of the gun Karam Singh Daulatpur carried on him. The group was surrounded by the police in Babeli the next morning. Police Superintendent Smith, seeking their live capture, unsuccessfully tried to persuade them to surrender. Upon noticing the police approaching, they headed towards Gurdwara Chaunta Sahib across a small stream. Karam Singh continued firing in order to stave off the police. As they entered the stream, the police opened fire and Karam Singh, Udai Singh, Mohinder Singh and Bishan Singh were shot dead.

==== Jawala Singh ====
Dhanna Singh, another important Babbar leader, was similarly betrayed by one of his associates, Jawala Singh, who was housing him for the night. Dhanna Singh had been sent to Mannanhana village on 24 October 1923 to enquire about another Babbar leader, Dalip Singh of Dhamian Kalan. While Dhanna Singh was asleep, Jawala Singh damaged his weapons and informed police. Hoshiarpur Superintendent of Police A.F. Horton, Assistant Superintendent of Police W.N.P. Jenkin, and 38 officers and men reached the home at midnight on 25 October. The force surrounded the house and forced their way in. After a long struggle, Dhanna Singh was arrested and handcuffed. Horton then taunted Dhanna Singh, that he had in fact been arrested alive while vowing otherwise. He was about to be searched when he managed to detonate an explosive in his pocket, destroying his right side and killing him instantly. Five police were also killed instantly in the explosion, with another later dying in the hospital. Horton and Jenkin, along with four inspectors, were severely injured, with Horton dying of internal hemorrhage on the morning of 3 November 1923.

== Trial ==
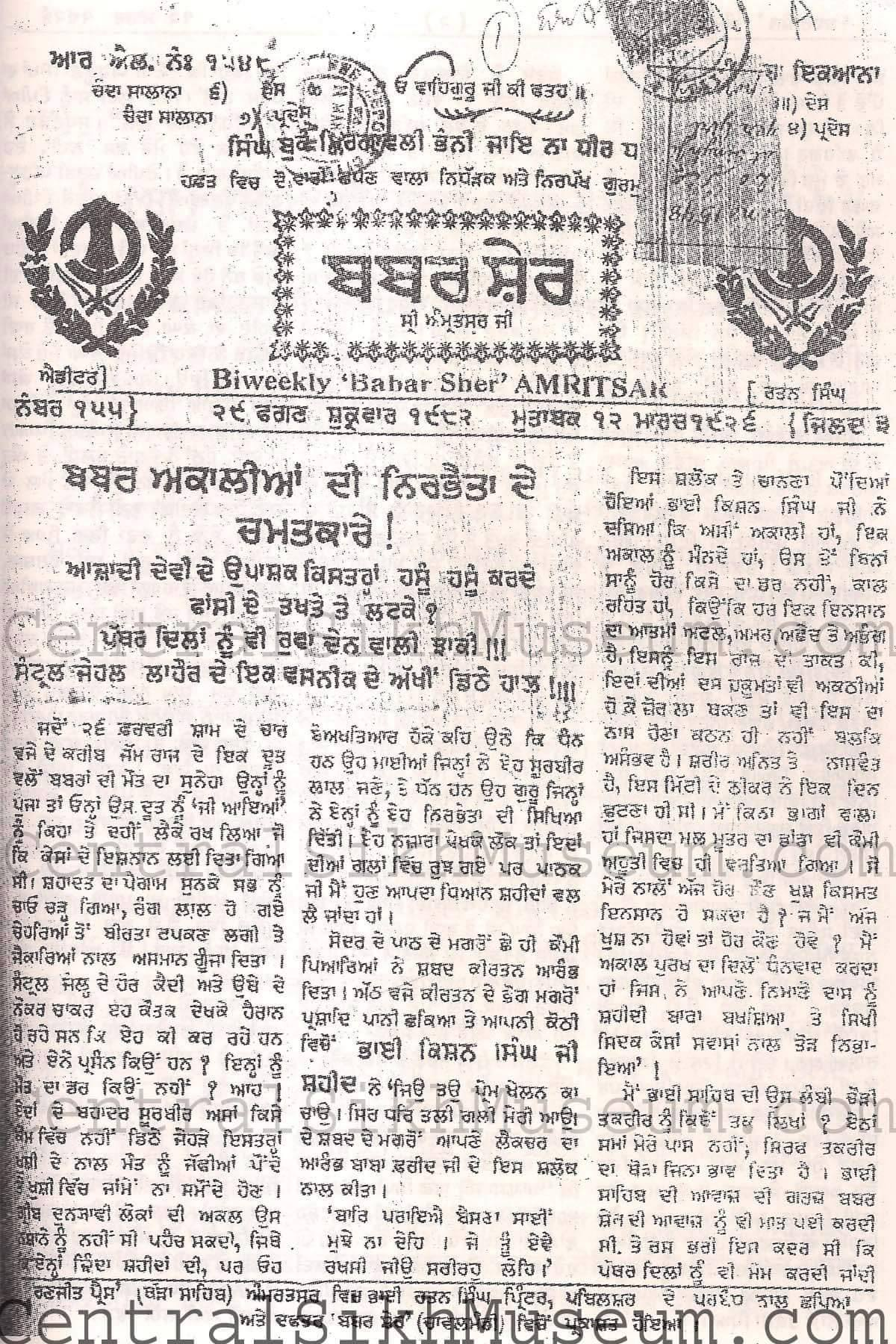
Front page of an issue of 'Babar Sher', 12 March 1926 issue. This issue reports an interview of six Babbar Akālīs a day before their martyrdom.

By mid-June of 1924, all important Babbars had either been killed in police encounters or taken prisoner. The movement essentially came to an end when Waryam Singh Dhugga was tracked and shot by the police in Lyallpur district in June 1924.

The trial procedure of detained Babbars had begun on 15 August 1923 in Kot Lakhpat Jail in Lahore, with 62 originally challaned and 36 more added in January 1924. Of them, 2 died during investigations and 5 acquitted by the magistrates; the remaining 91 were committed to the sessions in April 1924. Arrests had totaled 226, of whom 104 were present in camera. Additional Sessions Judge J. K. M. Tapp, appointed to try conspiracy cases, opened the proceedings on 2 June 1924, assisted by four assessors, with Diwan Bahadur Pindi Das Sabharwal as special public prosecutor. The defendants were instructed to select defense attorneys, though some including Kishan Singh, Sunder Singh Makhsuspuri, Dalip Singh Sandhra, Karam Singh, and Babu Santa Singh did not have representation, deciding not to cooperate with the government in the court proceedings.

The prosecution produced 447 witnesses, 734 documents and 228 other exhibits as evidence. The judgement was delivered on 28 February 1925. Of the 91 accused, including 17 informers and 15 fugitives, two had died in jail during trial, 34 were acquitted, 5 were sentenced to death, and the remaining 49 were sentenced to varying terms of imprisonment, including 11 to life imprisonment. The government and police were not satisfied with the sentences, and filed a revision petition in the High Court, headed by Judges Boardway and Harrison, which overruled the Sessions Court judgement on a few points, but upheld the death sentences.

Five Babbars would pass away during trial, while eight would die fighting in police encounters. One Babbar, mistrī Amar Singh, was never arrested.

=== Death sentences ===
In the final judgment delivered on 19 January 1926, six Babbars were condemned to death and 13 to life imprisonment, with 29 sentenced to various prison terms and 40 acquittals. Kishan Singh Gargajj, Babu Santa Singh, Dalip Singh Dhamian, Karam Singh Manko, Nand Singh Ghurial and Dharam Singh Hayatpur were hanged on 27 February 1926.

=== After the movement ===
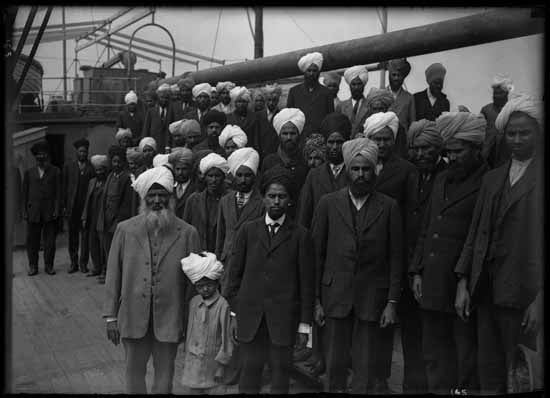
Sikh men aboard the S.S. Komagata Maru, including Gurdit Singh and his son Balwant.

Several Babbars acquitted by the court continued their activities after the movement was suppressed. In 1933, safaidpoś Bela Singh Jian, who had killed two Ghadarites and collaborated with William C. Hopkinson in infiltrating the Ghadar Movement and in the Komagata Maru incident, was killed by a team consisting of Hari Singh of Sundh, Ishar Singh of Jandoli, Bakhshish Singh of Chabbewal, and Hazara Singh of Maki. In 1936, Anup Singh Manko, the turncoat who had caused the death of Karam Singh Daulatpur of Babbar Akālī Doābā, was assassinated by Gurdit Singh, Kartar Singh Kirti and Ujagar Singh, who was one of the youngest Babbars. On 25 March 1940, Bachitter Singh and Ajaib Singh assassinated Karam Singh of Mannanhana, who had gotten Dhanna Singh of Behbalpur killed. This action would conclude Babbar activities, as Babbar remnants would split and join other groups and factions.

== Legacy ==
Despite mainstream Akālī disavowals, the Babbar movement contributed to the Akālī movement by increasing Akālī bargaining power with its campaign against the colonial bureaucracy and its supporters, compelling the Government to come to terms with them, and weakening opposition to the Akālīs by vested interests in the villages. Though their revolutionary scope has been described as "limited," assassinating relatively few zaildārs, lambaṛdārs, police informants and moneylenders instead of potentially organizing rural support into a broader front against the feudal system and its British enablement, the Babbars did emphasize the economic grievances of the peasantry, unlike the Akālīs, and placed much greater emphasis on the anti-British part of their objectives than many mainstream Akālīs, while continuing to support gurdwara reform.

The Babbar Akālīs were strongly attached to their Sikh faith, with their ideological discourse filled with religious imagery, notions of the loss of Sikh sovereignty, and the need to assert Sikh identity. As such, they were part of the transitional stage of contemporary anti-colonial peasant-based movements towards further ideological development, which was needed for such movements to evolve the sophistication necessary for handling modern complexities.

With the end of the Akālī movement, Sikh resistance elements found outlets through organisations like Bhagat Singh's Naujawan Sabha and the Kirti Kisan Party of Sohan Singh Josh and other leftists; both movements in the Punjab owed their militant policy and tactics to the Babbar campaign. The movement forms part of the legacy of resistance of the Doaba region, especially that of the Hoshiarpur district, from where most of the Ghadarites and Babbar Akālīs hailed, and which would be active during the later insurgency. The Babbar Akālī Jatthā left a permanent mark on Sikh history and the national independence movement.

Babbar Khalsa International was established in an attempt to emulate the Babbar Akalis.

== List of engagements ==
- Battle of Babeli (1 September 1923)

== See also ==
- Kharku

== Bibliography ==
- Singh, Bhupinder (2011). "5: The Babbar Akali Lehar". The Anti-British Movements from Gadar Lehar to Kirti Kisan Lehar: 1913–1939. Patiala: Punjabi University. pp. 227–259.
- Singh, Mohinder (1988). "7: The Politics of Terrorism". The Akali Struggle: A Retrospect. Atlantic Publishers and Distributors. pp. 119–132. ISBN 9788171562695.
- Nijjar, Bakhshish Singh (1987). History of the Babar Akalis. ABS Publications. ISBN 9788170720102.
- Kaur, Gurinder (September 2018). "The Babbar Akalis of Hoshiarpur" (PDF). Research Guru: Online Journal of Multidisciplinary Subjects. 12 (2): 366–370. ISSN 2349-266X.
