= Johal (disambiguation) =

Johal is a surname.

Johal may also refer to:

- Johal, Jalandhar, a village in Punjab, India
- Johal, Phillaur, a village in Punjab, India
- Johal, Faisalabad, a village in Punjab, Pakistan
