= Salempur =

Salempur may refer to:

- Salempur, Gaya, a village in Gaya district, Bihar, India
- Salempur, Saran, a village in Saran district, Bihar, India
- Salempur, Uttar Pradesh, a town in India
  - Salempur (Lok Sabha constituency), the parliamentary constituency for the town
- Salempur, Gosainganj, a village in Lucknow district, Uttar Pradesh, India
- Salempur, Kakori, a village in Lucknow district, Uttar Pradesh, India
- Salempur, Nepal, a village development committee in Sarlahi District

== See also ==
- Salempur Masanda, a village in Jalandhar District in Punjab, India
