= Khiala Pind =

- village
- Location in Punjab, India Khiala Pind (India)
- Coordinates: 31.42°N 75.78°E
- Country: India
- State: Punjab
- District: Jalandhar

Languages
  - Official: Punjabi
- Time zone: UTC+5:30 (IST)
- PIN: 144 104
- Vehicle registration: PB- 08

Khiala Pind is a village near Adampur in the Jalandhar district of the state of Punjab in India. It has 15 hectares of land. The village population was 500 in the 1991.

== Geography ==
Khiala is located in the fertile plains of Doaba, Punjab. It shares boundaries with the villages of Daroli Kalan, Padhiana (West), Damunda and Daroli Khurd (East).

== History ==
Khiala Pind is a part of the Minhas clan villages of this region. A majority of the residents have relatives living in, or can trace their origins to the village of Daroli Kalan.

A short distance from the heart of Khiala Pind is the Dera Sant Pura Jabar, a well-known religious establishment.

The Minhas Family

The majority of residents within Khiala Pind are Minhas Rajputs.

== St Baba Bhag Singh Institute of Education ==
Within the Khiala Pind jurisdiction operates the St Baba Bhag Singh Institute of Education. The institute was established in 2002 with more than 10,000 students attending each semester.

Sant Baba Bhag Singh University is known for its technical curriculum and employs many residents of nearby villages.

== See also ==
- Punjabi Rajput
