= Sangowal (disambiguation) =

Sangowal may refer to:

- Sangowal is a village in Kapurthala district of Punjab State
- Sangowal (Ludhiana West) is a village located in the Ludhiana West tehsil, of Ludhiana district, Punjab.
- Feroz Sangowal is a village in Bhulath Tehsil in Kapurthala district of Punjab State, India.
