= Manko =

Manko may refer to:

- Manko (poet), an Edo period Japanese poet
- Lake Man (Okinawan:Manku, Japanese: Manko), a wetland in Naha, Okinawa
- Kurenai Manko (紅萬子), a Japanese actress
- Manko Hime (萬子媛), princess who built the Yūtoku Inari Shrine
- Manko, Jalandhar, a village in Punjab, India

== See also ==
- Manco (disambiguation)
