= Lakhpul =

- Village
- Kheri Jalab in Haryana, India Lakhpul (India)
- Coordinates: 29.102200°N 75.461343°E
- Country: India
- State: Haryana
- District: Hisar

Government
  - Type: Local government
  - Body: Panchayat

Languages
  - Official: Hindi
- Time zone: UTC+5:30 (IST)
- PIN: 125052
- Vehicle registration: HR-20
- Website: haryana.gov.in

Lakhpul is a village near Adampur in the Hisar district of the Indian state of Haryana.
