= Rakh Syedan =

Rakh Syedan is a village situated in Sheikhupura District. It is situated on the Sargodha Road near Parco branch.

The tomb of Syed Hassan Badr ul din Gillani is in the Masanian Village in India. The Sadaat of Rakh Syedan had migrated from Masanian Shareef the village in Gurdaspur, India.
