= Jasvir Singh (weightlifter) =

Canadian weightlifter of Indian origin (born 1977)

Personal information
- Nationality: Canada
- Born: 13 April 1977 (age 49) Karnana, India
- Height: 1.60 m (5 ft 3 in)
- Weight: 62 kg (137 lb)

Sport
- Sport: Weightlifting
- Event: 62 kg
- Club: Vikings Weightlifting Club (CAN)
- Coached by: Guy Greavette (CAN)

Jasvir Singh (born April 13, 1977 in Karnana, India) is a Canadian weightlifter of Indian origin. He qualified for the men's featherweight category at the 2008 Summer Olympics in Beijing, by finishing seventh from the Pan American Weightlifting Championships in Callao, Peru. He is also a five-time Indian and a three-time Canadian champion.

Singh started his sporting career as a sixteen-year-old high school student in the small village of Punjab. In 2002, he came to Vancouver, British Columbia, Canada on a working visa, and also, in hopes for a more promising future and better life. While staying in Canada, Singh was unable to travel to international weightlifting competitions, and barred from participating in prestigious national events. He was discovered by former Olympian and coach Guy Greavette, who perceived him as a powerful athlete and quickly helped him build a sport. Singh made his international debut as part of the Canadian team at the 2003 World Wrestling Championships in Vancouver, and eventually attained numerous successes by winning back-to-back national titles. In 2007, he gained his landed immigrant status, and held a dual citizenship with Canada, making him eligible to compete for the Olympics.

Singh became the first weightlifter from British Columbia to represent Canada at the 2008 Summer Olympics, since his head coach Greavette did so in 1988. In the men's featherweight class, he successfully lifted 115 kg for the single-motion snatch, and hoisted 151 kg more for the two-part, shoulder-to-overhead clean and jerk, to combine a total of 266 kg, finishing in twelfth place.
