= Salempur Masanda =

Salempur Masanda Salempur Masandan
- village
- Location in Punjab, India Salempur Masanda (India)
- Coordinates: 31.2941191°N 75.6661141°E
- Country: India
- State: Punjab
- District: Jalandhar

Population (2001)
  - Total: 1,488

Languages
  - Official: Punjabi
- Time zone: UTC+5:30 (IST)
- Vehicle registration: PB-
- Coastline: 0 kilometres (0 mi)
- Nearest city: Jalandhar City and Jalandhar Cantonment

Salempur Masanda is a village in Jalandhar district, near the Jalandhar Cantonment, in Punjab, India.

== Demographics ==
According to the 2001 Census, Salempur Masanda has a population of 1,488 people. The village is 178 acres (72 ha) in size. The village has a large concentration of people with the surname Johal. According to village elders, families with the Johal surname originally came from the village of Jandiala which has a substantial concentration of Johal families.

Neighbouring villages include Dhanowali, Talhan, Semi, Khajurla, Pragpur and Birring.

== Baba Dassa Ji Gurdwara ==
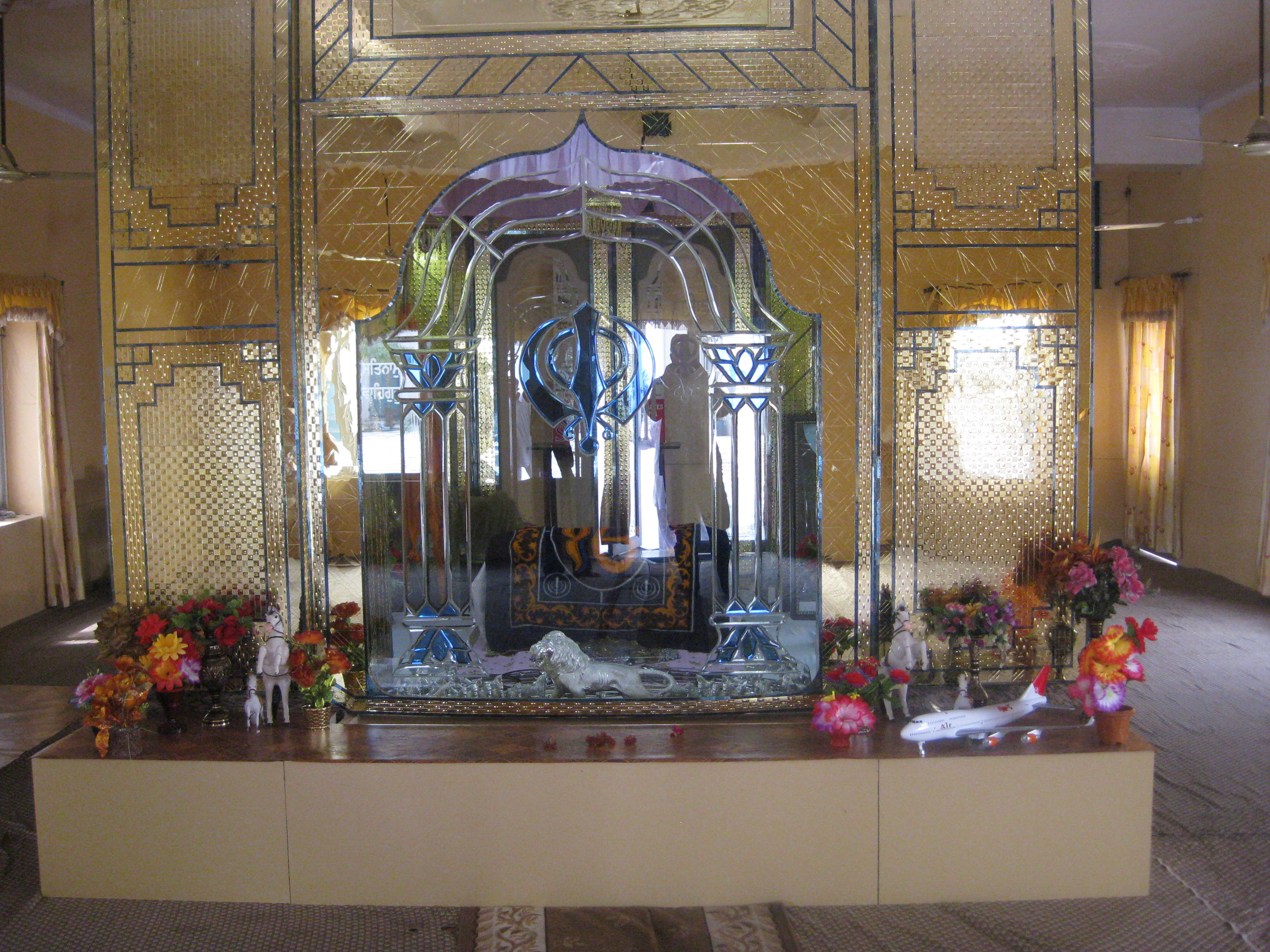
Salempur Masandan Baba Dasa Ji (Inside)

The village is famous for its Baba Dassa Gurdwara. It is said that Baba Dassa Ji was a devout follower of Sri Guru Hargobind Sahib Ji and used to take wooden logs to Kartarpur to be used to fire the communal kitchen.

The village organises the annual Baba Dassa Ji Mela and Sports Tournament in June. Activities include Bail Gaddi races, Kabaddi matches, volleyball matches and tug-of-war matches. The Baba Dassa Ji Youth Club organised the 55th Sports Tournament in June 2009.

The 57th Sports Tournament was organised in June 2011.

A documentary on the village was aired on the Sikh Channel on 14 April 2012 showing Baba Dassa Gurdwara.
