= Karnana, India =

Coordinates: 31°08′N 76°01′E

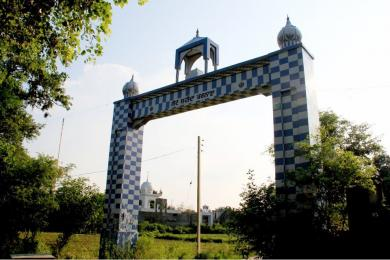

Karnana is a village in Punjab, India, approximately 5 km from Banga in Shaheed Bhagat Singh Nagar district (formerly known as Nawan Shahir). It falls in Tehsil/Mandal Banga or Bangian. Other tehsils in this district besides Banga are Aur, Balachaur, Saroya and Nawansahir.

== Demographics ==
According to ‘Census Report for Punjab 1883’ (Denzil Ibbetson) and ‘Census Report for Punjab 1892’ (E.D.Maclagan) this village was populated by Parihar Rajputs. Karnana, Sahlon and Sarhal Mundi are the only villages listed in early records as Rajput according to the book titled ‘Rajput jo sikh bane’. Karnana has a mix of Sikh and Hindu Rajput families plus Brahmin and Chamars few other minority casts. The total population of this village is 2869 (M 1465, F1404) according to the last available census data.

== History ==
The historical origin of this village can be traced back to the early sixteenth century. It is believed that the foundation of this village was laid by Mian Phul Chand. Mian Sansar Chand of Rajpura (near Amb in present-day district Una of Himachal Pradesh) was a relative of Manhas Rajputs of Daroli Kalan (now in district Jalandhar, Punjab). Rajpura in past was the capital of the Jaswal Rajput kingdom of Jaswan, while Daroli (consisting of many villages around present day Daroli Kalan) was an important Jagir in this kingdom.

Mian Sansar Chand received some land as gift from the Manhas Rajput relatives, where he established the village of Kalra. Fifth in generation to Sansar Chand were two brothers Mian Phul Chand and Mian Amnu (similar-sounding name). Mian Phul Chand married a Doad Rajput lady from the royal houses of Gunachaur. He received some land in dowry from his in-laws. He later moved from Kalra to his new land and established the village of Karnana. Books like ‘Itihaas Doaba Rajput’ written by Parmar, A.C. shed some light on the very little documented history of Doaba Rajput Villages of this region. No doubt some references can be found in memoirs of Babur, Akbar and Jahangir translated by various authors but the information is varied and sketchy. There is an old Shivdwala consolidating old rajput ancestry and gurdwaras linking as to how sikhism flourished at a later date in this region in the face of Mugal invasion as well as during Maharaja Ranjit Singh’s time to which this village is no exception. Old Mati of Mian Sahib and Jand Sahib also link to old ancestry.
