= Rurki Khas =

Village in Punjab, India

- Village
- Location in Punjab, India Rurki Khas (India)
- Coordinates: 31.1614°N 76.1537°E
- Country: India
- State: Punjab
- District: Hoshiarpur

Government
  - Type: Panchayat raj
  - Body: Gram panchayat
- Elevation: 253.7 m (832 ft)

Population (2011)
  - Total: 1,866
- Sex ratio 950/916 ♂/♀

Languages
  - Official: Punjabi
- Time zone: UTC+5:30 (IST)
- PIN: 144532
- ISO 3166 code: IN-PB

Rurki Khas, popularly known as Rurki Sainian, is a village in Hoshiarpur district of Punjab State, India. It is located 47.10 kilometers (29.26 miles) away from the district headquarter Hoshiarpur, 5.90 kilometers (3.66 miles) from tehsil Garhshankar and 75.85 kilometers (47.13 miles) from the state capital Chandigarh. The village is situated west of the Jalandhar Branch of the Bist Doab Canal. The village was electrified in 1963. The village is administrated by a Sarpanch an elected representative of the village.

== Demography ==
As of the 2011 census of India, Rurki Khas has 395 households and population of 1866, of which 950 are male and 916 are female. The literacy rate is 75.03%.

The Schedule Caste population makes up 465 or 24.92% of the total population in Rurki Khas. The town does not have any Schedule Tribe population.

Historical population
Year	Pop.
1951	1,388
1961	1,454
1971	1,471
1981	1,687
1991	N/A
2001	1,989
2011	1866

== Education ==
The village has a Punjabi medium, co-educational Government Senior Secondary School. The school consists of grades from 6 to 12 and is located in the Garhshankar block of Hoshiarpur district. The school was established in 1965 and is managed by the Department of Education.

The village also has another Government Senior Secondary School called Shahid Master Malkit Singh Govt. Senior Secondary School

== Landmarks ==
Gurdwara Moti Bagh, Gurdwara Darwaja Sahib, Ravidaas Gurdwara are religious sites in the village.

Shaheed Numbardaar Bhagat Singh Memorial Statue.

== History ==
Rattan Singh Rakkar, jathedar of the Garhshankar Branch of the Babbar Akali movement, took refuge in the village of Rurki Khas in 1932. Meehan Singh of Garhi, a police informant, spotted him and Rattan Singh Rakkar was killed in an encounter with the police on 15 July 1932.

For giving protection to Rattan Singh Rakkar, the British Government imposed the following punishments:

1. A Police post was established in the village, the expenditures of which were to be borne by the villagers.
2. They were fined Rs. 6000/- to make the payment to the Police establishment posted there from 1932 to 1934.
3. Pensions of all the pensioners of this village were not paid for 5 years, which amounted to Rs. 7000/-
4. The villagers were deprived of the right of getting Government services.
5. Those who had actively supported this political struggle could not move out of the village, without the prior sanction of the Government.
6. The whole village was entered in the black list of the British Government.

== See also ==
- List of villages in India
