= Johal, Jalandhar =

Johal
- Village
- Location in Punjab, India Johal (India)
- Coordinates: 31.345967°N 75.644860°E
- Country: India
- State: Punjab
- District: Jalandhar
- Seat: Jalandhar

Government
  - Type: Local Government
  - Body: State Government of Punjab, Government of India
- Elevation: 238 m (781 ft)

Population (2011)
  - Total: 1,573

Languages
  - Principal: Hindi, Punjabi
- Time zone: UTC+5:30 (IST)
- Telephone code: 0181
- Vehicle registration: PB- 08

Johal is a village in Jalandhar district of Punjab, India. It lies in Jalandhar East Tehsil at distance of 6 Kilometers from Jalandhar.

== Nearby ==
Jandu Singha, Bolina and Kangniwal are the nearby villages to Johala. Jalandhar, Kartarpur, Phagwara, Adampur are the nearby Cities to Johal.
