= Jai Lal Ubhi =

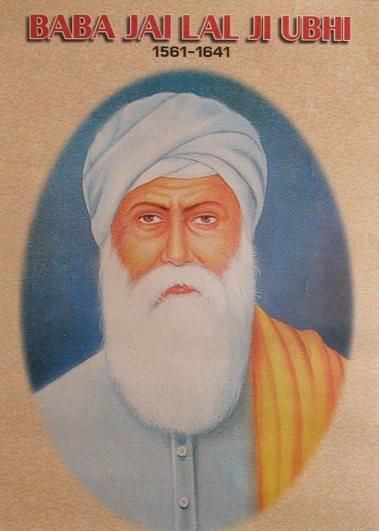
Baba Jai Lal Ji Ubhi

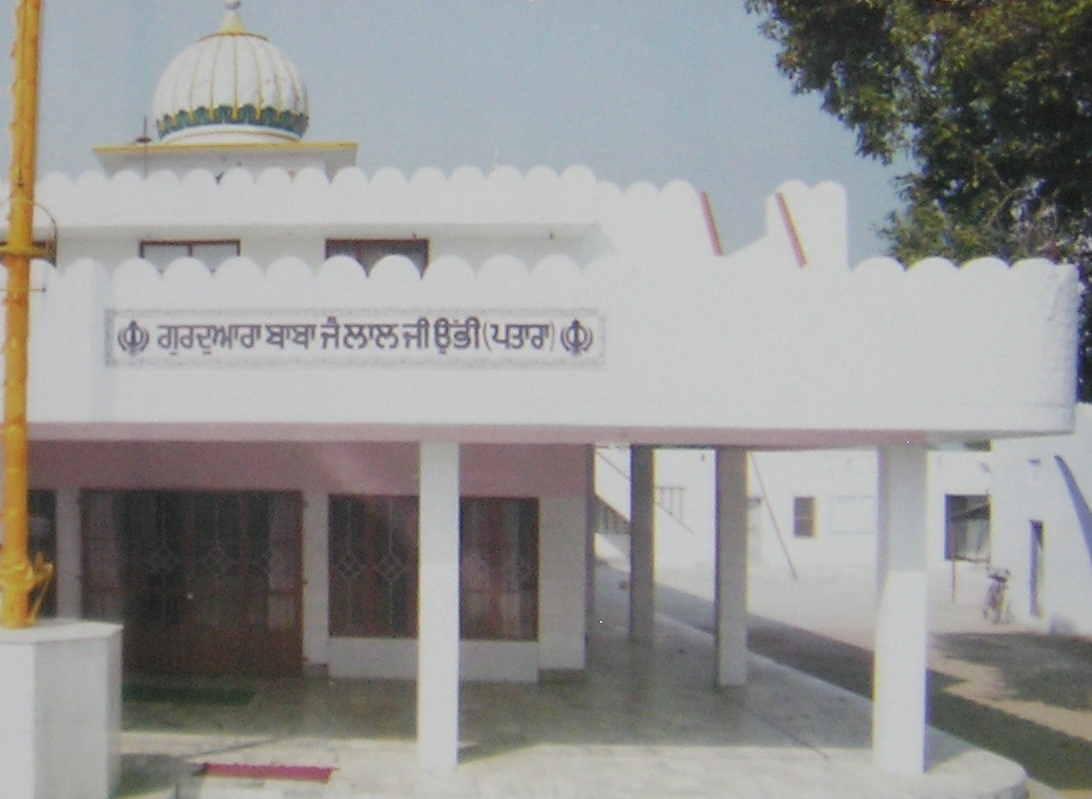
Baba Jai Lal Ji Gurdwara, at Jalandhar Cantonment, Punjab, India

Baba Jai Lal Ji Ubhi (Punjabi:ਬਾਬਾ ਜੈ ਲਾਲ ਜੀ ਉੱਭੀ) (June 1561 - 1641) is a Sikh religious figure who is venerated for his religious devotion and service to the fifth Sikh Guru, Guru Arjan Dev Ji.

== Early life ==
Baba Jai Lal ji Ubhi was born in the village of Patara (near the city of Jalandhar, Punjab, India) to a Sikh (Ramgarhia) family. His father's name was Baba Bhagtoo ji, and his mother's name was Nihalo ji. Both his parents died when he was 12 or 13 years old. That great loss moved him in the training of professional skill to living hood at the same time, he attached to Sikh basic values dasavndh and kirt karo vand shako and spiritual training in the guidance of Shri Guru Arjun dev ji and Baba Buddha ji.

== Career ==
Baba Jai Lal ji ubhi was an expert craftsman who selflessly donated his services to the construction of Thum Sahib, a Gurdwara commissioned by Guru Arjan Dev Ji, near Kartarpur. Baba Jai Lal Ubhi's work can be found in Gurdwara Thum Sahib, which still stands today.

Noting Jai Lal's altruistic contributions and faith, Guru Arjan Dev Ji blessed Jai Lal ubhi. It is believed that, in addition to Guru Arjan Dev Ji, Baba Budha Ji also blessed Jai Lal, and that Baba Dasa Ji from the nearby village of Slampur, although a few years his senior, considered Jai Lal to be his spiritual teacher.

Baba Jai Lal Ji maintained a hut for prayers outside the village of Patara, and devotees visited this hut to seek his spiritual advice and blessings. To honor his memory, a Gurdwara named after Baba Jai Lal Ji was erected at Jalandhar Cantonment at the original location of this hut.
