= Bolina (disambiguation) =

Bolina can refer to:

- Bolina, a nymph in Greek mythology
- Bolina (Achaea), an ancient city in Greece
- Bolina, Punjab, a census town in India
- Bolina, a genus of fossil crustaceans, now deemed a junior synonym of Pseudastacus
- Bolina, a genus of moths, now deemed a junior synonym of Drasteria
- Bolina, a genus of ctenophores now deemed a junior synonym of Bolinopsis
- Bolina, a genus of snails now deemed a junior synonym of Phasianella

== See also ==
- Bolinas, California, an unincorporated coastal community and census-designated place in Marin County, California
