= Kishan Singh Gargaj =

Indian revolutionary (1883–1916)

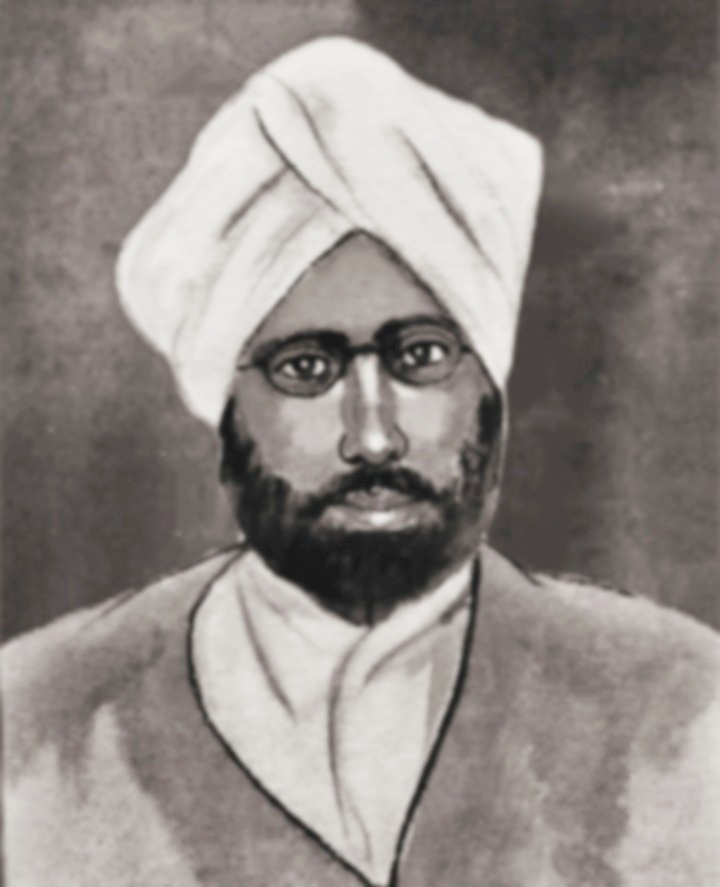
- Born: 7 January 1886; Village Birring, Jalandhar district, Punjab, British India
- Died: 27 February 1926 (aged 40); Lahore Central Jail, Lahore, Pakistan, British India
- Cause of death: Execution by Hanging
- Known for: Indian freedom struggle
- Movement: Babbar Akali Movement

Kishan Singh Gargaj (1886-1926) was an Indian anti-colonial revolutionary from Punjab. He was one of the founders of the Babbar Akali movement and one of the renowned martyrs in the Babbar Akali movement.

== Early life ==
He was born into a Sikh family and was only son of his father Fateh Singh, Kishan Singh was born at village Birring, Jalandhar district, a place just two furlongs to the east of Jalandhar Cantonment. Before he entered on political activities, he was in Indian army for a period of about fifteen years serving in Battalion no. 35. He was promoted to the rank of Havaldar Major and was due for promotion as Jamadar when he resigned his service. While in the army, he was once accused of the anti-British remarks and detained in Quarter Guard for 28 days.

== Revolutionary activities ==
When he left the army, the Akali movement was in full swing. Without any hesitation he became member of the Shiromani Akali Dal and after a short time was appointed its General Secretary. But he had no faith in the non violent methodology of the Akalis and gave preference to armed struggle over peaceful movements. Circumstances helped him to translate his ideas into practice. In the Akali Conspiracy Case, Hoshiarpur, his warrants of his arrest were issued. To evade arrest were issued he became a fugitive and started working underground.

Shortly after, he organized a band of the radicals and gave it the name of Chakravarti Jatha (ever moving band). The band was meant to carry on propaganda against the British Government and to strike awe in the minds of its functionaries by use of arms whenever necessary. Among its members the most notable were Sunder Singh Makhsuspuri, Karam Singh Dhariman, Babu Santa Singh and Master Mota Singh. To begin with, he held special diwans where he made speeches advocating the use of arms for freedom from British rule. The next step was to take action against ultra-loyalists like jamaldars, kotwalis and zaildars.

A meeting was held in 1922, where it was decided to warn these people first and to cut off the ears of those who did not heed the warning. Even lists of such people were drawn. After sometime, however, the decision was revised and it was resolved that the real remedy was to assassinate them. The same meeting decided to reorganize the Chakravarti Jatha under the name of Babbar Akali Dal. Kishan Singh was elected its president, Dalip Singh Gaunsal became its Treasurer. Karam Singh Kinkar, Karam Singh Daulatpuri and Uday Singh were elected working members. The new organization brought out its revolutionary paper which was printed at a press called Udaru Press (flying or mobile press).

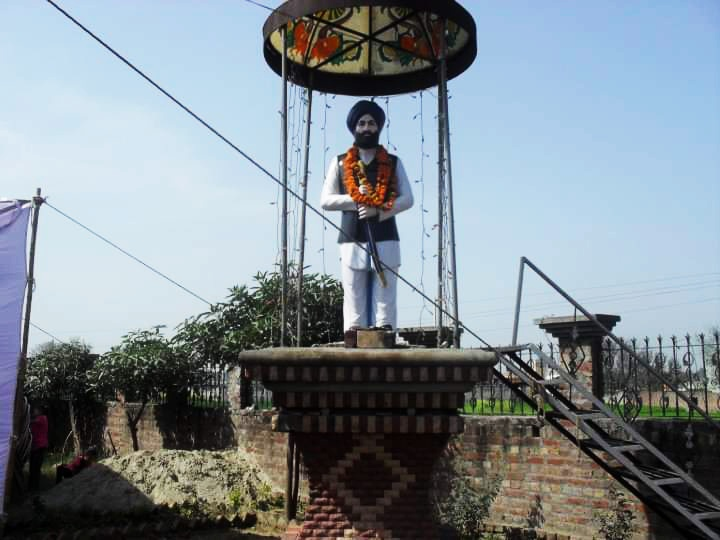
Statue of Martyr Kishan Singh Gargaj

To curb the influence of the Babbar Akalis, British Government put up a prize of rupees two thousand on Kishan Singh's head. A number of dacoits fell under his spell and agreed to abide by the discipline of the Babbars and to work in collaboration with them. While he was working full-steam, Kishan Singh (called Gargaj from his powerful manner of speaking) was arrested at Pindori Mahal on 26 February 1923 through the treachery of one Kabul Singh of his own village, Birring (whom lived across the street from Gargaj's home). He was detained in Lahore Central Jail. A special tribunal was created for his trial which lasted from 2 June 1924 to 28 February 1925. The most remarkable feature of the trial was Kishan Singh's long statement running into 125 pages in indictment of repressive British administration. As was to be expected, he was sentenced to death and was hanged on 27 February 1926. authorities refused to hand over his dead body to the members of his family but the huge crowd that had gathered outside the jail ultimately forced them to follow the public demand. The body was cremated on the bank of the Ravi. He was only 40 years old when hanged. On account of his passionate patriotism, integrity of character and power of speech he had verily become the patriotic ideal of the people of Punjab.
