= Mehndipur =

- Village
- Location in Punjab, India Mehndipur (India)
- Coordinates: 31.1421865°N 76.12286°E
- Country: India
- State: Punjab
- District: Shaheed Bhagat Singh Nagar

Government
  - Type: Panchayat raj
  - Body: Gram panchayat
- Elevation: 355 m (1,165 ft)

Population (2011)
  - Total: 84
- Sex ratio 48/36 ♂/♀

Languages
  - Official: Punjabi
- Time zone: UTC+5:30 (IST)
- PIN: 144514
- Telephone code: 01823
- ISO 3166 code: IN-PB
- Post office: Kulam (B.O)
- Website: nawanshahr.nic.in

Mehndipur is a village in Shaheed Bhagat Singh Nagar district of Punjab State, India. It is located 2.2 kilometres (1.4 mi) away from branch post office Kulam, 3.4 kilometres (2.1 mi) from Nawanshahr, 11.7 kilometres (7.3 mi) from district headquarter Shaheed Bhagat Singh Nagar and 92.7 kilometres (57.6 mi) from state capital Chandigarh. The village is administrated by Sarpanch an elected representative of the village.

== Demography ==
As of 2011, Mehndipur has a total number of 20 houses and population of 84 of which 48 include are males while 36 are females according to the report published by Census India in 2011. The literacy rate of Mehndipur is 83.56% lower than the state average of 75.84%. The population of children under the age of 6 years is 11 which is 13.10% of total population of Mehndipur, and child sex ratio is approximately 833 as compared to Punjab state average of 846.

As per the report published by Census India in 2011, 26 people were engaged in work activities out of the total population of Mehndipur which includes 23 males and 3 females. According to census survey report 2011, 99.99% workers describe their work as main work and 0.01% workers are involved in Marginal activity providing livelihood for less than 6 months.

== Education ==
KC Engineering College and Doaba Khalsa Trust Group Of Institutions are the nearest colleges. Industrial Training Institute for women (ITI Nawanshahr) is 3.9 kilometres (2.4 mi). The village is 74 kilometres (46 mi) away from Chandigarh University, 50 kilometres (31 mi) from Indian Institute of Technology and 46 kilometres (29 mi) away from Lovely Professional University.

List of schools nearby:

- Dashmesh Model School, Kahma
- Govt Primary School, Kahlon
- Govt High School, Garcha

== Transport ==
Nawanshahr train station is the nearest train station however, Garhshankar Junction railway station is 10.3 kilometres (6.4 mi) away from the village. Sahnewal Airport is the nearest domestic airport which located 58.5 kilometres (36.4 mi) away in Ludhiana and the nearest international airport is located in Chandigarh also Sri Guru Ram Dass Jee International Airport is the second nearest airport which is 155 kilometres (96 mi) away in Amritsar.

== See also ==
- List of villages in India
