= Patara, Jalandhar =

Patara
- Village
- Location in Punjab, India Patara (India)
- Coordinates: 31.340974°N 75.669515°E
- Country: India
- State: Punjab
- Elevation: 238 m (781 ft)

Languages
  - Official: Punjabi
- PIN: 144101
- Telephone code: +91-181-XXX XXXX
- Vehicle registration: PB 08

Patara is a village located in Jalandhar district in the state of Punjab in North India.

== Location ==
The village is located off the Jalandhar-Hoshiarpur Road, about 8-9 kilometres from the Jalandhar city centre. Hoshiarpur City is about 40 km from Patara. The Jalandhar Cantonment is located about 5 km from Patara.

== History ==
Patara Village was found by a Dullo, a wrestler Jat landlord belonging to Khunkhun Clan, nearly 500 years ago. The mother of Dullo Jatt was from Kangniwal village, near Jalandhar.

Nihala and Ruldu were the descendants of Dullo Jatt. the Khunkhun Jatt families of Patara maintain the suffix of the two names, Nihala Ke descendants of Nihala and Ruldu Ke descendants of Ruldu.

== Area Information ==
Post Office at Patara.

The Patara village has a Police Station, Bank of India (nationalised bank), a Cooperative Bank, a Sub-Post Office (Indian Postal Service Pin Code 144101), a Commercial Centre and a Verka milk producers society.

Gurdwara Peeplan Wala Sahib is located right across the Shiva Temple. The Girls High School was established in 1989. There is also a High School and a Library in the village.

The streets are fairly narrow and suitable for single-lane driving only. The land around the village is flat and fertile. Much of the development of the village was carried out under the leadership of Om Parkash who was unanimously elected Sarpanch for 3 consecutive terms of 4 years each.

== Notable people ==
- Master Mota Singh, Freedom fighter and co-Founder Babbar Akali Movement
