= Padhiana =

- village
- Location in Punjab, India Padhiana (India)
- Coordinates: 31.41°N 75.81°E
- Country: India
- State: Punjab
- District: Jalandhar

Languages
  - Official: Punjabi
- Time zone: UTC+5:30 (IST)
- PIN: 144 030
- Telephone code: 0181
- Vehicle registration: PB- 08

Padhiana is a village in the tehsil and district of Jalandhar, Punjab, India. It falls in Adampur block of the district. The village has 794 hectares (1962 acres) of land. The population of Padhiana was 2885 at the 1991 census.

== Geography ==
Padhiana is located in the fertile plains of Doaba, Punjab. It is bordered by Bist Doab canal on West, Khanaura village on South, and a brook (Choe) on North.

Jalandhar, Hoshiarpur and Phagwara cities are all within 30 km of the village.

== History ==
Padhiana is a remaining legacy of the Minhas Confederation of villages. Minhas Rajputs of this village are descendants of Shri Baba Kati Deo Ji (alias Kati Ji), a feudal lord of the 16th century, who was a vassal to the Jaswal Raja (King) of Jaswan. Shri Kati Deo was the younger brother of legendary Shri Mati Deo.

The founding ancestor of this village migrated from Daroli, today Daroli Kalan, when family fortunes split. The village today has seven Pattis (family branches). A detailed record of each Minhas family is maintained by genealogists in Hardwar, Uttarakhand.

In 1815, the village became a part of Sikh empire when territories of the Raja of Jaswan were confiscated by Ranjit Singh. A few decades later, following the second Anglo-Sikh war, it was transferred to British along with other territories of Punjab.

Historical personalities from this village include Sikh warriors, Sangat Singh Ji, Uday Singh Ji, and Bachiter Singh Ji; all served in the tenth Sikh Guru, Gobind Singh Ji's army. Later, Sikh Chiefs from this village served in the army of famous Sikh leader Banda Bahadur Singh Ji, who offered them a Fief (Jagir) which lies in what is today the Patiala district of Punjab. These Chiefs later built a fort and established Bahadurgarh village in their new land. A medieval well in Padhiana, now sealed, still exists, commemorating these Chiefs. It is called Bahadargarhian Da Khoo (the well of Bahadargarh Chiefs).

A Brahman Lady's tomb commemorating her Sati still stands near the village in the North crematory, reminiscent of the medieval traditions of Padhiana gentry. The pond adjoining the crematory is called "Tal Satiwati" or, in English, "Pond of the Sati Lady".

== Transportation ==
Road: Phuglana on Hoshiarpur - Phagwara road is 4 km from Padhiana while Adampur on Hoshiarpur - Jalandhar road is 11 km.

Railway: Khurdpur railway station is 10 km.

Airport: Raja Sansi airport in Amritsar is the nearest International Airport and is about 110 km from Padhiana.

== Education, Health Care and other services ==
There is a bank (Punjab and sind bank), a post office, a government dispensary, and a primary school in the village. A high school, a degree college, an engineering college, a government hospital, and a private hospital are within 5 km of the village. Its Senior Secondary School, Padhiana, has run for many years and students from other nearby villages also study there. A statue of Shaheed Bachiter Singh was erected in the playground of Padhiana by village residents.

== Demographics ==
The village is 95% (Rajput) Sikh and 5% Hindu. There are 7 Gurudwaras including Gurudwara Pahari Darwaja, Gurudwara Bohra Khoo and Bhagat Ravidas Gurdwara. There is one Shiv dwala (a Hindu temple dedicated to Lord Shiva). There are also two other places of worship, 'Lakhan Da Datta', located in the village, and 'Peer Badhe Shah Ji', about 3 km from the village. There is also a "BHAGWAN VALMIK MANDIR", a "SHANI MANDIR" and a "GUGA JAHAR VEER MANDIR" This religious diversity regarding places of worship is indicative of the fact that Padhiana's residents respect all religions.

== Administration ==
The Panchayat (village council) administers the village affairs. There are nine elected members to the panchayat, eight panch, and a Sarpanch (Mayor). The members are elected for a period of four years.

== Army officers of this village ==
(Excerpt from The Tribune dated August 11, 2006)

As many as 282 Army personnel, hailing from Padhiana village, exhibited their valor in the World War I and World War II and more than 35 youth from the village still serve in the Indian Army, while some have joined the Indian Air Force. Unfortunately, this fact has not been properly acknowledged by the district's administration: over 400 ex-servicemen say that their courage and sacrifice has not been duly rewarded. Their only demand is a Sainik Bhawan: that is, a government funded facility for military personnel. While a hall, library room, meeting room and veranda has been completed in the past six years, the building is yet not ready for use, and there are no provisions for power connection, a water supply, a kitchen and toilets.

Regarding military affairs, Sardar Brigadier Manjit Singh, hailing from this village, was awarded Maha Vir Chakra, India's second highest gallantry award, for his leadership in 1987's Jaffna operations of the Indian Army. Major (later Brigadier) Varinder Singh Minhas, and Vir Chakra, an officer, successfully led Indian Army's famous Siachan operation against Pakistan in 1984. Both were of Padhiana origin. The operation resulted in many gallantry awards for its participating soldiers, including a Param Vir Chakra award for Sardar Bana Singh, the only soldier to ever win this award while alive.

The village has an entrance gate dedicated to the memory of Subedar Bir Singh, who fought in World War I as well as WWII. A stone erected outside of a gurdwara pahari darwaja sahib ji (a Sikh house of worship) in the village reads: "176 men went to war from this village from 1914 to 1919. Eight sacrificed their lives."

On March 4, 1949, the first Commander-in-Chief of the country, General K.M. Cariappa, came to this village via the invitation of Col. Dilbagh Singh on Minhas.

== Padhiana residents ==
- Rahul Dev, Bollywood actor
- Mukul Dev, Bollywood actor
