= Master Mota Singh =

Indian patriot and revolutionary

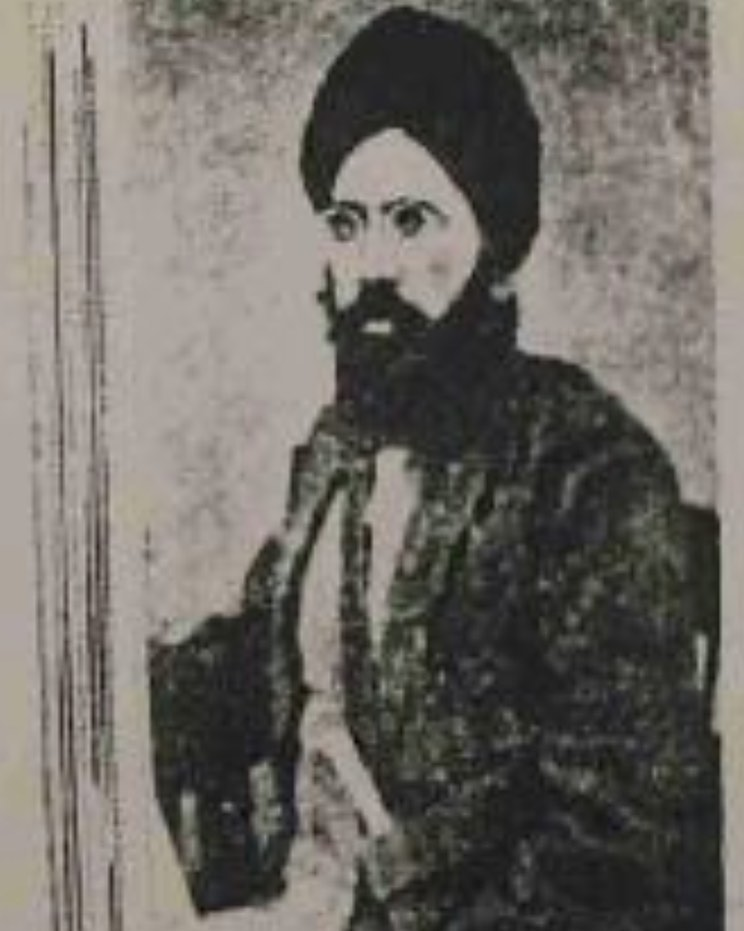
- Portrait of Mota Singh
- Born: 28 February 1888; Patara, Jalandhar Punjab (British India)
- Died: 9 January 1960 (aged 71); Jalandhar, Punjab (India)
- Known for: Freedom Fighter
- Notable work: Resistance to British Colonial Rule; Agrarian Reform
- Movement: Babbar Akali Movement; India Independence Movement

Master Mota Singh was an Indian Sikh freedom fighter in the early 20th-century Punjab. He was one of the leaders of Babbar Akali Movement which mobilised disillusioned Sikhs, Ghadarites, Army men and the peasantry of Punjab.

== Early life ==
Mota Singh was born on 28 February 1888 in Patara, a village located approximately 7 km east of Jalandhar in British Punjab, into a Jhir Sikh family. He was the son of Gopal Singh and Rali Kaur. His grandfather, Sahib Singh, served as a soldier in the Sikh Army and fought against the British in the Anglo-Sikh Wars in Punjab.

== Education ==
Mota Singh completed his Matriculation and earned a Bachelor of Arts degree in English. He was proficient in Urdu, Arabic and Persian. During 1914–1915, he served as the Headmaster of Sant Sukha Singh Khalsa Middle School in Amritsar. He also held the position of the Headmaster at Khalsa High School in Tarn Taran. In addition, he taught at Mastuana College.

== Revolutionary activities ==
=== Activism & Imprisonment ===
The British Government passed the Rowlatt Act in 1918 and Mota Singh was arrested on 11 April 1919 for delivering a speech against the government at a large gathering held at the Shahi Mosque in Lahore. After the Rowlatt Act was withdrawn, he and other prisoners were released in December 1919. Initially, Mota Singh worked to rally Sikhs in rural Punjab to support the nonviolent Non-cooperation movement in 1920.

=== Babbar Akali Movement ===
In 1921, Master Mota Singh and Kishan Singh Gargajj led the Babbar Akalis, a breakaway faction from the Akali Movement. The Akali Movement sought nonviolent methods for its campaigns, but attacks from government authorities radicalized some of its members who adopted armed resistance. The faction made its first formal appearance during the Sikh Educational Conference held at Hoshiarpur from 19 to 21 March 1921.

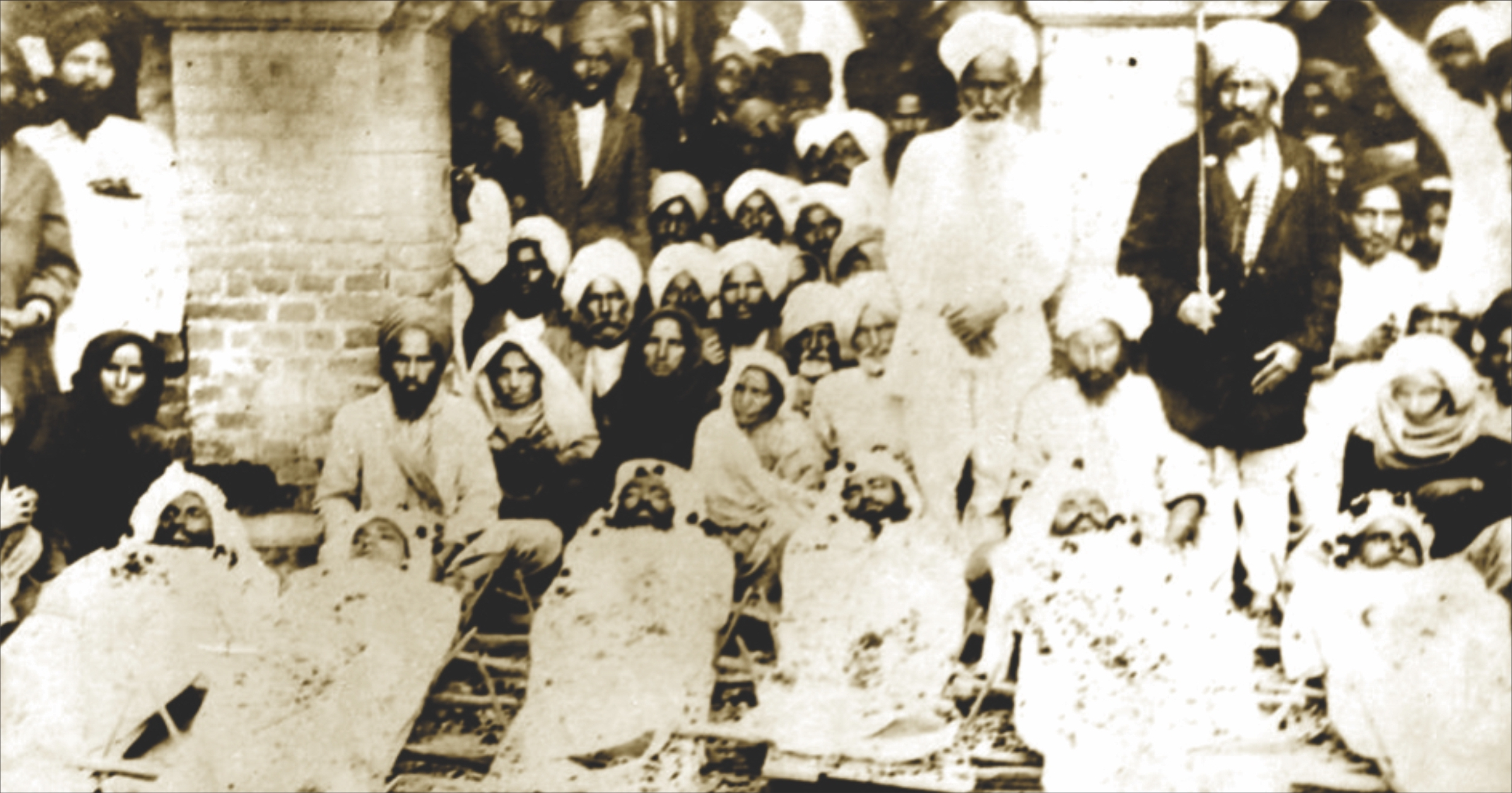
Six martyrs of the Babbar Akali Jatha from 27 February 1926

In November 1921, Mota Singh delivered a speech at the annual fair held at Gurudwara Nankana Sahib. He spoke against the British colonial rule, about the oppression of the peasants and resisting the payment of taxes. The police officers tried to arrest him but Mota Singh escaped as the people surrounded him in order to defend him from the police with their Kirpans.

In February 1922, a large public assembly (Deewan) was convened in the village of Kot-Phatuhi. The police surrounded the area from all sides as Mota Singh proceeded to deliver his address. Following the instructions of the meeting's president, the audience stood up and dispersed. Amidst this confusion, Mota Singh managed to escape the police and evade the arrest.

In 1922, the British Government announced a reward of two murabbas (fifty acres) of land for Mota Singh's arrest. He was arrested on 17 June 1922 while he was visiting his village Patara. He declined to defend himself in the law court and was sentenced to five years imprisonment on the evidence presented in the court from his own speeches and writings. He went on a hunger strike as he was not allowed to wear his Dastar in jail. The government accepted his demand and granted permission to wear the turban. In 1927, Mota Singh was released from jail but he was arrested again. In July 1929, The Tribune, Lahore published a message by Master Mota Singh,

"See together, dream together, live together. Learn to know your foes and friends. Foster the conviction that salvation of humanity can only be evolved through the revolutionary creed of thinking dangerously, acting dangerously, sleeping and walking dangerously. Let the youth of India make this maxim the ideal of their life."

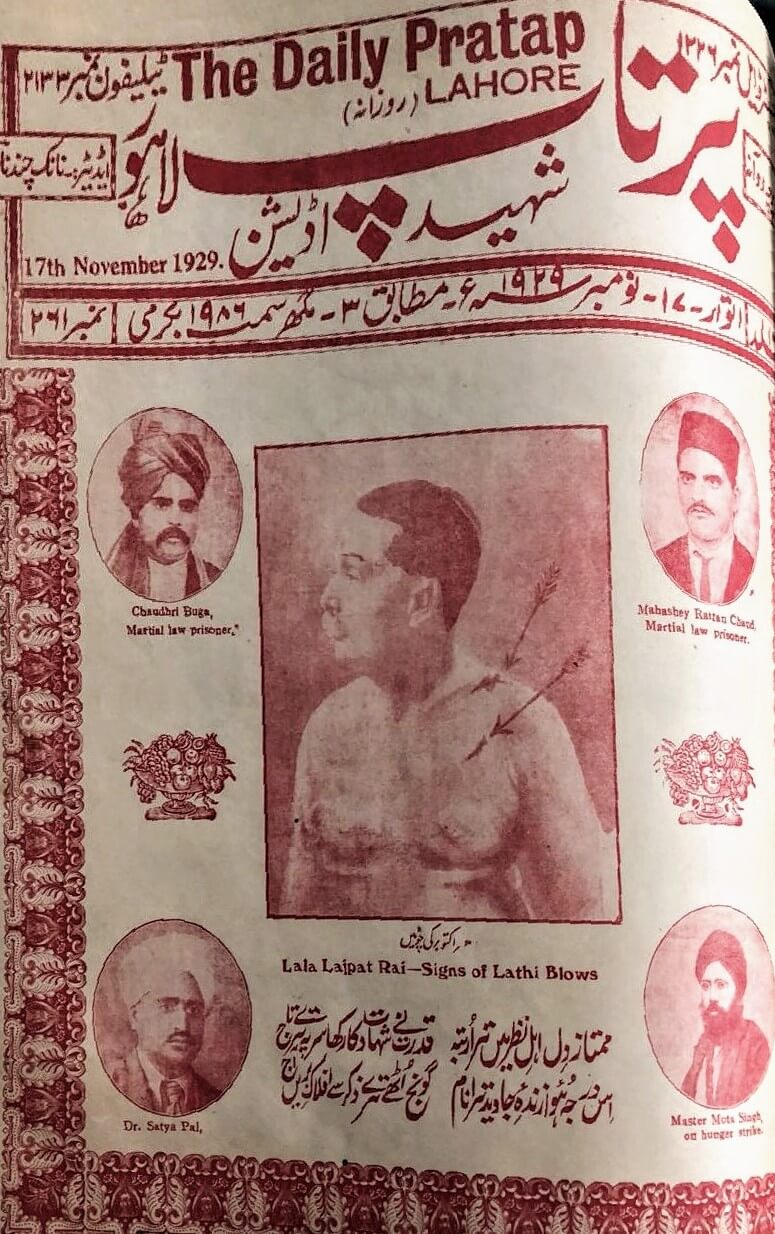
The portrait of Master Mota Singh (bottom-right) featured in the Page of the martyrs' edition of the Daily Pratap, (17 November 1929).

In 1929, Mota Singh was elected as the member of All India Congress committee. In August 1929, he was arrested for delivering a speech at a conference of the Naujawan Bharat Sabha. In 1931, Mota Singh was arrested and imprisoned for two and half years. He undertook a 105-day hunger strike to secure the right to keep his Kirpan, a religious dagger, with him in jail. Mota Singh was imprisoned for participating in the Quit India Movement, which was launched by Gandhi in 1942 to 1945.

== Activism post 1947 ==
In 1952, Master Mota Singh was elected as a Member of Legislative Assembly in Punjab. However, he resigned shortly after due to his disagreements with the Indian National Congress party in 1953. After resigning as the MLA, he took part in the Kisan Movement and began working as the President of the District Kisan Sabha in Jalandhar. Before Mota Singh's death in 1960, he actively participated in a farmers’ movement against the Betterment Tax introduced by Pratap Singh Kairon Government in 1959.
