= Laroya, Punjab =

Laroya
- Village
- Location in Punjab, India Laroya (India)
- Coordinates: 31.0975357°N 75.9730109°E
- Country: India
- State: Punjab
- District: Shaheed Bhagat Singh Nagar

Government
  - Type: Panchayat raj
  - Body: Gram panchayat
- Elevation: 251 m (823 ft)

Population (2011)
  - Total: 999
- Sex ratio 527/472 ♂/♀

Languages
  - Official: Punjabi
- Time zone: UTC+5:30 (IST)
- PIN: 144507
- Telephone code: 01823
- ISO 3166 code: IN-PB
- Post office: Mukandpur
- Website: nawanshahr.nic.in

Laroya is a village in Shaheed Bhagat Singh Nagar district of Punjab State, India. It is located 7.2 kilometres (4.5 mi) away from postal head office Mukandpur, 12 kilometres (7.5 mi) from Banga, 15 kilometres (9.3 mi) from district headquarter Shaheed Bhagat Singh Nagar and 106 kilometres (66 mi) from state capital Chandigarh. The village is administrated by Sarpanch an elected representative of the village.

== Demography ==
As of 2011, Laroya has a total number of 211 houses and population of 999 of which 527 include are males while 472 are females according to the report published by Census India in 2011. The literacy rate of Laroya is 80.18%, higher than the state average of 75.84%. The population of children under the age of 6 years is 86 which is 8.61% of total population of Laroya, and child sex ratio is approximately 911 as compared to Punjab state average of 846.

Most of the people are from Schedule Caste which constitutes 27.23% of total population in Laroya. The town does not have any Schedule Tribe population so far.

As per the report published by Census India in 2011, 307 people were engaged in work activities out of the total population of Laroya which includes 288 males and 19 females. According to census survey report 2011, 77.52% workers describe their work as main work and 22.48% workers are involved in Marginal activity providing livelihood for less than 6 months.

== Education ==
The village has a Punjabi medium, co-ed upper primary with secondary school founded in 1976. The schools provide mid-day meal as per Indian Midday Meal Scheme. As per Right of Children to Free and Compulsory Education Act the school provide free education to children between the ages of 6 and 14.

Sikh National College Banga and Amardeep Singh Shergill Memorial college Mukandpur are the nearest colleges. Lovely Professional University is 36 kilometres (22 mi) away from the village.

== Landmarks and history ==
The area earlier ruled by the Mughals. In 1634, Guru Hargobind, the sixth Sikh Guru visited here while he was on his way to Kiratpur after winning the Battle of Kartarpur with Mughals. The village has a historical Sikh shrine Gurudwara Shri Panj Tirath Sahib at the boundary of nearby village Paragpur which was named by Guru Hargobind and built by Maharaja Ranjit Singh. The gurudwara is situated near by the dargah Panj Peer in Paragpur dedicated to the five peers.

== Transport ==
Banga train station is the nearest train station however, Nawanshahr railway station is 15 kilometres (9.3 mi) away from the village. Sahnewal Airport is the nearest domestic airport which located 53 kilometres (33 mi) away in Ludhiana and the nearest international airport is located in Chandigarh also Sri Guru Ram Dass Jee International Airport is the second nearest airport which is 144 kilometres (89 mi) away in Amritsar.

== See also ==
- List of villages in India
