= Kishanpura =

Kishanpura 11 PTP - किशनपुरा उत्तराद्धा
- Village
- Interactive map of Kishanpura
- Coordinates: 29.891944°N 74.288°E
- Country: India
- State: Rajasthan
- District: Hanumangarh

Government
  - Type: Panchayati Raj System (Zilla Parishad, Panchayat Samiti)
  - Body: Gram Panchayat
  - Sarpanch: Smt. Renu Sanjay Athwal

Languages
  - Official: Rajasthani
- Time zone: UTC+5:30 (IST)
- PIN: 335062

Kishanpura is an rural area in Sangaria tehsil in district Hanumangarh in state of Rajasthan in India. It's been the most hot and dear area for builders and has seen stupendous growth in the past few years. Many commercial and residential projects have and are being built in the area. Kishanpura has an excellent connectivity to Sangaria, Hanumangarh, Sadulshahar, Sriganganagar and Abohar. The property prices have been continuously rising, and the living standards and amenities have been improving.
