= Johal, Faisalabad =

Town in Faisalabad District, Punjab, Pakistan

Coordinates: 31°31′N 73°23′E

Johal (also known as Chak No. 97/RB) is a village/town in Faisalabad District, Punjab, Pakistan. It is located within the larger Jaranwala town near Faisalabad city.

The geographical coordinates of the town are: 31° 31' 0" North, 73° 23' 0" East.
