= Kishanpur =

- Village
- Location in Punjab, India Kishanpur (India)
- Coordinates: 31.341877°N 75.5847652°E
- Country: India
- State: Punjab
- District: Jalandhar

Government
  - Type: Panchayat raj
  - Body: Gram panchayat
- Elevation: 240 m (790 ft)

Languages
  - Official: Punjabi
- Time zone: UTC+5:30 (IST)
- ISO 3166 code: IN-PB
- Website: jalandhar.nic.in

Kishanpur is a village in Jalandhar district of Punjab State, India. It is located 3 kilometres (1.9 mi) from district headquarter Jalandhar and 151 kilometres (94 mi) from state capital Chandigarh. The village is administrated by a sarpanch, who is an elected representative of village as per Panchayati raj, a system of local self-government of villages in rural India.

== See also ==
- List of villages in India
