= Manco =

Manco is a male given name, and may refer to:

- Manco Capac, also known as Manco Inca and Ayar Manco, according to some historians, founder and first governor of the Inca civilization in Cuzco, possibly in the early 13th century
- Manco Inca Yupanqui (1516–1544), founder and monarch of the independent Neo-Inca State in Vilcabamba, originally a puppet Inca Emperor installed by the Spaniards
- Manco, the nickname of the Man with No Name, a character in the film For a Few Dollars More

Manco may also refer to:

- Manco Inc., manufacturer of Duck Tape brand products, now a part of Shurtape Technologies
