= Chaudhari =

Chaudhari may refer to:

- Chaudhari (surname), a traditional title used by the landowners in the Indian subcontinent; now predominantly used as a surname
- Chaudhari, Nepal
- the Chodri language of Gujarat
- an Indian name of the Dangaura Tharu language
- a dialect of the Jumli language of Nepal
