= Nanda Chaur =

Nanda chaur
- Village
- Location in Punjab, India Nanda chaur (India)
- Coordinates: 31.562950°N 75.756778°E
- Country: India
- State: Punjab
- District: Hoshiarpur

Government
  - Type: Gram Panchayat
  - Body: Gram Panchayat Nanda Chaur

Area
  - Total: 2.1 km^{2} (0.81 sq mi)

Population (2011)
  - Total: 3,478
- Demonym: Nandachauria

Languages
  - Official: Punjabi, Hindi, English
- Time zone: UTC+5:30 (IST)
- PIN: 146114
- Telephone code: +91-1882
- Vehicle registration: PB 07
- Sex ratio: 890:849 ♂/♀

Nanda Chaur is a village in Hoshiarpur district, Punjab, India. It is also known as Nanda Chaur Dham due to the Shri Om Darbar temple situated at Nanda Chaur. It contains multiple schools and colleges as well as a hospital. The village is situated at Bullowal to Bhogpur road and approximately 20 kilometres from its belonging district Hoshiarpur.

== Demographics ==
According to Census 2011 Nanda Chaur village has population of 3478 of which 1780 are males while 1698 are females. And total number of families residing here are 723.

== Education ==
=== Colleges ===
- There is one degree college Shri Om Narayan Dutt Girls degree college Nanda Chaur.

=== Schools ===
- Govt High School.
- Govt Primary School.
- Sant Shardha Ram ji Girls school.
- Hrakrishan Public school.

== Distance from other cities ==
Hoshiarpur = 18 km, Chandigarh = 157 km, Jalandhar = 38 km, New Delhi = 420 km, Dharmshala = 135 km.
