= Adampur =

Adampur Adampur Doaba
- Town
- Location in Punjab, India
- Coordinates: 31.43°N 75.72°E
- Country: India
- State: Punjab
- District: Jalandhar
- Founder: Rahi Litt

Government
  - MLA (Member of Legislative Assembly): Sukhwinder Singh Kotli (Indian National Congress)
- Elevation: 233 m (764 ft)

Population (2011)
  - Total: 20,922

Languages
  - Official: Punjabi
- Time zone: UTC+5:30 (IST)
- PIN: 144102

Adampur is a town, a municipal council and a sub-tehsil in Jalandhar district in the Indian state of Punjab.

== Geography ==
Adampur Doaba is located at 31.43°N 75.72°E. It has an average elevation of 233 metres (764 feet). It is located at a distance of 24 km from its district headquarters Jalandhar and approximately 26 km from Hoshiarpur. The nearest hill station is Dharamshala which is the headquarters of the Dalai Lama. Another hill-station around Adampur is McLeodganj. The Main Bazaar is the main market and one of the best areas to live in and around the town.

It is situated in the center of Punjab and its two main cities, Jalandhar and Hoshiarpur.

The clock tower of Adampur and Punjab Khadi Mandal are some of the oldest buildings of this town. The Khadi Bhandar was inaugurated by Mahatma Gandhi.

The Adampur Air Force Station was built by the British in the early 1900s and is the second largest Air Force base in India. The domestic airport of Jalandhar is also situated at Adampur.

The railway line which runs through Adampur was constructed by the British in 1902. Adampur train station was built, which was later renamed Khurdpur due to the close proximity of the Air Force base.

== History ==
According to the history the town was founded by a person named Rahi who was a Jatt of Litt Clan and originally named it Raipur Litt\Raipur Littan, later Bhaun Jatts took possession of the town and sold it to a pathan named Adam Khan who was from the Village Dhogri & he renamed it to Adampur.

Adam Khan's brother Alawal Khan setup Alawalpur, a nearby village.

== Demographics ==
As of the 2011 India census, the Adampur Municipal Council had a population of 20,922, of whom 11,152 were males while 9,770 were females as per the report released by Census India 2011. Adampur had an average literacy rate of 87.98%, higher than the national average of 75.84%. 12% of the population was under 6 years of age. The scheduled caste population was 47.30%.

The Virdi family of the Ramgarhia community are one of the oldest serving families in Adampur, tracing their settlement into the town from the 1700s.

== Legislative setup ==
The city is part of the Adampur legislative assembly constituency. Sukhwinder Singh Kotli of Congress is the current MLA from this seat. The town comes under the Jalandhar parliamentary constituency, which is currently represented by Charanjit Singh Channi of Indian National Congress.

== See also ==
- Khurdpur
- Khiala Pind
