= Bhojowal =

- Census town
- Location in Punjab, India Bhojowal (India)
- Coordinates: 31.329583°N 75.644828°E
- Country: India
- State: Punjab
- District: Jalandhar

Government
  - Type: Panchayat raj
  - Body: Gram panchayat
- Elevation: 240 m (790 ft)

Population (2011)
  - Total: 1,266
- Sex ratio 655/611 ♂/♀

Languages
  - Official: Punjabi
- Time zone: UTC+5:30 (IST)
- ISO 3166 code: IN-PB
- Website: jalandhar.nic.in

Bhojowal is a census town in the Jalandhar district of Punjab State, India. It is situated 10 kilometres (6.2 mi) from Jalandhar, 21 kilometres (13 mi) from Phagwara, 39 kilometres (24 mi) from the district headquarters Hoshiarpur, and 148 kilometres (92 mi) from the state capital Chandigarh. The village is governed by a sarpanch, who is an elected representative of the village as per the Panchayati Raj system in India.

== Transport ==
Jalandhar City Railway Station is the closest train station to the village. The village is situated 72 kilometres (45 mi) away from the domestic airport in Ludhiana, and the nearest international airport is located in Chandigarh. Additionally, Sri Guru Ram Dass Jee International Airport in Amritsar serves as the second nearest airport, which is approximately 104 kilometres (65 mi) away.

== See also ==
- List of villages in India
