= Sadhara =

- Village
- Location in Punjab, India Sadhara (India)
- Coordinates: 30.9851131°N 75.6291452°E
- Country: India
- State: Punjab
- District: Jalandhar

Government
  - Type: Panchayat raj
  - Body: Gram panchayat
- Elevation: 240 m (790 ft)

Population (2011)
  - Total: 126
- Sex ratio 61/65 ♂/♀

Languages
  - Official: Punjabi
- Time zone: UTC+5:30 (IST)
- PIN: 144038
- ISO 3166 code: IN-PB
- Website: jalandhar.nic.in

Sadhara is a village in Jalandhar district of Punjab State, India. It is located 16.2 km from Nurmahal, 19.7 km from Phillaur, 50 km from district headquarter Jalandhar and 130 km from state capital Chandigarh. The village is administrated by a sarpanch who is an elected representative of village as per Panchayati raj (India).

== Transport ==
Bilga railway station is the nearest train station; however, Phillaur Junction train station is 19 km away from the village. The village is 48.8 km away from domestic airport in Ludhiana and the nearest international airport is located in Chandigarh also Sri Guru Ram Dass Jee International Airport is the second nearest airport which is 140 km away in Amritsar.
