= Salempur, Gosainganj =

Village in Uttar Pradesh, India

Salempur
- Village
- Location in Uttar Pradesh, India Salempur (India)
- Coordinates: 26.72797°N 81.20053°E
- Country: India
- State: Uttar Pradesh
- District: Lucknow

Area
  - Total: 8.826 km^{2} (3.408 sq mi)
- Elevation: 111 m (364 ft)

Population (2011)
  - Total: 7,542
  - Density: 854.5/km^{2} (2,213/sq mi)

Languages
  - Official: Hindi
- Time zone: UTC+5:30 (IST)

Salempur is a village in Gosainganj block of Lucknow district, Uttar Pradesh, India. As of 2011, its population is 7,542, in 1,327 households. It is the seat of a gram panchayat.
