= Khajurla =

- Village
- Location in Punjab, India Khajurla (India)
- Coordinates: 31.277005°N 75.680445°E
- Country: India
- State: Punjab
- District: Kapurthala

Government
  - Type: Panchayati raj (India)
  - Body: Gram panchayat

Population (2011)
  - Total: 1,731
- Sex ratio 881/850♂/♀

Languages
  - Official: Punjabi
  - Other spoken: Hindi
- Time zone: UTC+5:30 (IST)
- PIN: 144411
- Telephone code: 01824
- ISO 3166 code: IN-PB
- Vehicle registration: PB-09
- Website: kapurthala.gov.in

Khajurla is a village in Phagwara tehsil in Kapurthala district of Punjab State, India. It is located 42 kilometres (26 mi) from Kapurthala, 14 kilometres (8.7 mi) from Phagwara. The village is administrated by a Sarpanch who is an elected representative.

== Transport ==
Jalandhar Cantonment and Chiheru are the nearest railway stations to Khajurla; Jalandhar City railway station is 11 km away. The village is 107 km from Sri Guru Ram Dass Jee International Airport in Amritsar. Another nearby airport is Sahnewal Airport in Ludhiana which is located 49 km away from the village. Phagwara, Jandiala, Jalandhar, Kartarpur are the nearby cities.
