= Sarhal Mundi =

Sarhal Mundi Chauhan
- village
- Location in Punjab, India Sarhal Mundi (India)
- Coordinates: 31.97°N 75.52°E
- Country: India
- State: Punjab
- District: Jalandhar
- Elevation: 228 m (748 ft)

Languages
  - Official: Punjabi
- Time zone: UTC+5:30 (IST)
- PIN: 144 502
- Telephone code: 01826
- Vehicle registration: PB 08
- Website: facebook-https://www.facebook.com/pages/Sarhal-Mundi/149220078458661

Sarhal Mundi is a village situated 5 miles south of Behram in Tehsil Phillaur, Jalandhar district, Punjab, also known as Sarhala, the village near MUKANDPUR.

The common belief is that the foundation of this village was laid by Gopal Chauhan - 6th generation of Lav Dev. Some argue that Lav Dev was not Prithvi Raj Chauhan's but Krishna Chauhan's son who was a General in Prithvi Raj Chauhan's army and fell martyr in the second battle against Muhammad of Ghor commonly known in the history as Shahabuddin Muhammad Ghori or Muhammad Gauri.

== History ==
A historic ‘Shiv Dawala’ and many old houses of small brick can roughly put the origin of this village back to as early as 16th century.

Elders of this village also talk of ‘Bundi’ links which make them Hara (Hadha) Chauhan's. Whatever may be the case Sarhal Mundi is one of the very few Rajput villages of Doaba besides Karnana and Sahlon which H. A. Rose's book lists as Rajput. The practice of census data recording cast ceased in 1947 when India gained independence.

== Demographics ==
This village is a nice mix of Sikh and Hindu Rajput families and many of its old inhabitants migrated to UK & USA. Late Thakur Des Raj Singh ji was the first person from this village to gain a prosecuting police officer's commission under the British and later retired as Prosecuting Deputy Superintendent of Police. He also won President's Gold Medal for his meritorious services. Thakur Kanwar Tek. C. Chauhan of this village was the first person to be selected as an I.A.S Officer. Another famous son of this village was Wing Commander Late Thakur Kuldip Chauhan. Besides the small temple adjoining it is the shrine of a NATH SIDDHA cult saint Bawa Utam Das who is credited with various miracles. Besides the names mentioned are the names of Mr Banta Singh who deserted the army and joined Indian National Army of Netaji Subash Chander Bose and Mr Ajit Singh of British army. Another person of note is Kanwar Gandharv Raj Chauhan Chief, an Executive Engineer, Civil Aviation, Saudi Arabia who established a medical centre in the village.

Source. Village Tehsil Records

== Overview ==
Just like most villages of this area Sarhal Mundi may be much older in historic terms than most of us think it is as the word ‘Mundi is found in ancient ‘Takka’ language. Old excavations of ‘Harrapa’ found around these villages of Phillaur also suggest that these areas have always been the hub of civilizations just the old has been replaced by the new. Some historians believe that from time to time Rajputs of these villages found new lands rather than submitting to invaders who ruled Northern India from time to time. Genealogical and physical attributes such as tall stature, good martial skills, fair colour as compared to others, stubborn nature, sense of adventure and travel and a belly full of fire makes Doaba Bist inhabitants of these villages more akin to Rajput ancestry. Sardar Gurdial Singh as quoted by H. A. Rose believes them to be of "good that Rajputs are linked to Indus Aryans holds powerful logic as proposed by H.S.Olcot in his 'Aryan Origins' theory, general sharp Grecian/Mediterranean/Caucasian features hint at an Aryan/Scythic descent. No matter what the argument it has to be admitted that North India was the melting pot out of which Rajputs kept their traditions alive. Present day Sarhal Mundi is only a shadow of its old self with many houses under lock and key and disrepair as inhabitants live abroad. The total adult population of voting age is just 1152 (M 569 F583). There is a Government Elementary School, girls school and medical centre. There also are the ruins of a small fort of Sikh era. There is general belief of connection with State of Bundi, Rajasthan during reign of Maharao Raja Sir Singh Bhadur. Plans exist for a hospital now. The Shrine of Baba Uttam Das and the pond are still there reviving the old nostalgia. Baba Uttam Das was a 'sadhu' (a sage, a holy man) who long time ago happen to come to this village and settled by the old village pond. According to folklore, one evening, he went door to door asking for mustard oil with which he could light the 'diya' (lamp made of clay) for his evening prayer to Hindu deities but no one in the village gave him any oil. In his anger he said that from now on wards no mustard oil mill will work in this village. To date there has never been a 'Kohlu'(mustard mill) in this village from that day. This village is easily accessible by going to Phagwara and travelling approximately 8 miles by the side of a canal, the route used by many buses and cars.

Key References: Philaur Tehsil Revenue Records Punjab Government, Ministry of Health records pertaining to Sarhal Mundi correspondence by orders of Late Dr Zail Singh, Chief Minister, Punjab later President of India.

Villager's genealogy Records are maintained and kept at Kusha Ghat, Haridwar, UP

Imperial Gazetteer of Punjab, Vol 1. Azziz Publishers, Lahore 1976 reproduced by Academy of Punjab, North America

Maharao Raja Sir Raghbir Singh Sahib Bhadur of Bundi State 1889 - 1927.

General reading. Last Hindu Emperor- Cynthia Talbot Annals and Antiquities of Rajasthan- James Tod Rise of Mohamaden Power India till 1612 - Ferishta translated by Briggs History of Jauhar in war. Predictions of Sanjukta- Bardic folklore Prithvi Raj Chauhan Raso, Chand Bardai by Durga Parsad Shastri in Hindi

Bawa Utam Dass. See Wikipedia extensive references under NATH SIDDAS Cult which originated in Rajasthan. Extent of Prithvi Raj Chauhan Empire which suggests Sarhal Mundi was the outpost of his empire which extended up to Byas River. From Byas to Lahore was ruled by his vassal Bhima. Lahore to Afghanistan was Ghaznavides Muslims
