= Ramgarh, Jalandhar =

Ramgarh ਰਾਮਗੜ੍ਹ
- Village
- Location in Punjab, India Ramgarh (India)
- Coordinates: 31.0181191°N 75.7748242°E
- Country: India
- State: Punjab
- District: Jalandhar
- Tehsil: Phillaur

Government
  - Type: Panchayat raj
  - Body: Gram panchayat
- Elevation: 246 m (807 ft)

Population (2011)
  - Total: 2,909
- Sex ratio 1510/1399 ♂/♀

Languages
  - Official: Punjabi
- Time zone: UTC+5:30 (IST)
- PIN: 144410
- Telephone code: 01826
- ISO 3166 code: IN-PB
- Vehicle registration: PB- 37
- Post Office: Phillaur
- Website: jalandhar.nic.in

Ramgarh (Punjabi: ਰਾਮਗੜ੍ਹ) is a medium size village in Phillaur tehsil of Jalandhar District of Punjab State, India. It is located 1 km (walking distance) away from postal head office Phillaur, 16 km from Ludhiana, 45 km from district headquarter Jalandhar and 118 km from state capital Chandigarh. The village is administrated by a sarpanch who is an elected representative of village as per Panchayati raj (India).

== Demography ==
As of 2011, Ramgarh has a total number of 567 houses and population of 2909 of which 1510 are males while 1399 are females according to the report published by Census India in 2011. The literacy rate of Ramgarh is 83.20%, higher than state average of 75.84%. The population of children under the age of 6 years is 319 which is 10.97% of total population of Ramgarh, and child sex ratio is approximately 734 as compared to Punjab state average of 846.

Most of the people are from Schedule Caste which constitutes 63.97% of total population in Ramgarh. The town does not have any Schedule Tribe population so far.

905 people were engaged in work activities out of the total population of Ramgarh which includes 798 males and 107 females. According to census survey report 2011, 84.75% of workers describe their work as main work and 15.25% workers are involved in marginal activity providing livelihood for less than 6 months. Of the 905 in the working population, 83.48% workers are occupied in main work, 12.9% are cultivators while 4.1% are Agricultural labourer.

== Transport ==
=== Rail ===
Phillaur Junction is the nearest train station; however, Bhattian Railway Station is 8.7 km away from the village.

=== Air ===
The nearest domestic airport is located 31.7 km away in Ludhiana and the nearest international airport is located in Chandigarh also Sri Guru Ram Dass Jee International Airport is the second nearest airport which is 140 km away in Amritsar.
