= Kotli Sheikhan =

- Village
- Location in Punjab, India Kotli Sheikhan (India)
- Coordinates: 31.4633429°N 75.6488152°E
- Country: India
- State: Punjab
- District: Jalandhar

Government
  - Type: Panchayat raj
  - Body: Gram panchayat
- Elevation: 240 m (790 ft)

Languages
  - Official: Punjabi
- Time zone: UTC+5:30 (IST)
- ISO 3166 code: IN-PB
- Vehicle registration: PB- 08
- Website: jalandhar.nic.in

Kotli Sheikhan is a village in Jalandhar district of Punjab State, India. It is located 28 kilometres (17 mi) from district headquarter Jalandhar and 169 kilometres (105 mi) from state capital Chandigarh. The village is administrated by a sarpanch who is an elected representative of village as per Panchayati raj (India). Mastar Joginder Singh s/o Khushiya Singh Lambardaar of Kotli Sheikhan.

- List of villages in India
