= Kulam, SBS Nagar =

Kulam
- Village
- Location in Punjab, India Kulam (India)
- Coordinates: 31.1328229°N 76.1319405°E
- Country: India
- State: Punjab
- District: Shaheed Bhagat Singh Nagar

Government
  - Type: Panchayat raj
  - Body: Gram panchayat
- Elevation: 355 m (1,165 ft)

Population (2011)
  - Total: 1,059
- Sex ratio 528/531 ♂/♀

Languages
  - Official: Punjabi
- Time zone: UTC+5:30 (IST)
- PIN: 144514
- Telephone code: 01823
- ISO 3166 code: IN-PB
- Post office: Nawanshahr
- Website: nawanshahr.nic.in

Kulam is a village in Shaheed Bhagat Singh Nagar district of Punjab State, India. It is located 3.3 kilometres (2.1 mi) away from postal head office Nawanshahr, 20 kilometres (12 mi) from Balachaur, 11.4 kilometres (7.1 mi) from district headquarter Shaheed Bhagat Singh Nagar and 89.8 kilometres (55.8 mi) from state capital Chandigarh. The village is administrated by Sarpanch an elected representative of the village.

== Demography ==
As of 2011, Kulam has a total number of 231 houses and population of 1059 of which 528 include are males while 531 are females according to the report published by Census India in 2011. The literacy rate of Kulam is 76.34% higher than the state average of 75.84%. The population of children under the age of 6 years is 104 which is 9.82% of total population of Kulam, and child sex ratio is approximately 962 as compared to Punjab state average of 846.

Most of the people are from Schedule Caste which constitutes 49.10% of total population in Kulam. The town does not have any Schedule Tribe population so far.

As per the report published by Census India in 2011, 328 people were engaged in work activities out of the total population of Kulam which includes 305 males and 23 females. According to census survey report 2011, 98.48% workers describe their work as main work and 1.52% workers are involved in Marginal activity providing livelihood for less than 6 months.

== Education ==
The village has a Punjabi medium, co-ed upper primary school established in 1996. The school provide mid-day meal as per Indian Midday Meal Scheme. As per Right of Children to Free and Compulsory Education Act the school provide free education to children between the ages of 6 and 14. The village also has an privet un-aided Hindi medium, co-ed primary with upper primary school established in 1990.

Amardeep Singh Shergill Memorial college Mukandpur and Sikh National College Banga are the nearest colleges. Industrial Training Institute for women (ITI Nawanshahr) is 3.3 kilometres (2.1 mi) The village is 47 kilometres (29 mi) from Indian Institute of Technology and 47 kilometres (29 mi) away from Lovely Professional University.

== Transport ==
Nawanshahr Doaba railway station is the nearest train station however, Phagwara Junction railway station is 41 kilometres (25 mi) away from the village. Sahnewal Airport is the nearest domestic airport which located 58 kilometres (36 mi) away in Ludhiana and the nearest international airport is located in Chandigarh (90 Km) also Sri Guru Ram Dass Jee International Airport is the second nearest airport which is 155 kilometres (96 mi) away in Amritsar.

== See also ==
- List of villages in India
