= Bika, Nawanshahr =

Bika
- Village
- Location in Punjab, India Bika (India)
- Coordinates: 31.1561788°N 75.9483576°E
- Country: India
- State: Punjab
- District: Shaheed Bhagat Singh Nagar

Government
  - Type: Panchayat raj
  - Body: Gram panchayat
- Elevation: 254 m (833 ft)

Population (2011)
  - Total: 771
- Sex ratio 363/408 ♂/♀

Languages
  - Official: Punjabi
- Time zone: UTC+5:30 (IST)
- PIN: 144509
- Telephone code: 01884
- ISO 3166 code: IN-PB
- Post office: Khankhana
- Website: nawanshahr.nic.in

Bika is a village in Shaheed Bhagat Singh Nagar district of Punjab State, India. It is located 1.6 kilometres (0.99 mi) away from Mukandpur, 7.9 kilometres (4.9 mi) from Banga, 19.6 kilometres (12.2 mi) from district headquarter Shaheed Bhagat Singh Nagar and 112 kilometres (70 mi) from state capital Chandigarh. The village is administrated by Sarpanch an elected representative of the village.

== Demography ==
As of 2011, Bika has a total number of 178 houses and population of 771 of which 363 include are males while 408 are females according to the report published by Census India in 2011. The literacy rate of Bika is 83.74%, higher than the state average of 75.84%. The population of children under the age of 6 years is 82 which is 10.64% of total population of Bika, and child sex ratio is approximately 640 as compared to Punjab state average of 846.

Most of the people are from Schedule Caste which constitutes 68.61% of total population in Bika. The town does not have any Schedule Tribe population so far.

As per the report published by Census India in 2011, 309 people were engaged in work activities out of the total population of Bika which includes 212 males and 97 females. According to census survey report 2011, 75.08% workers describe their work as main work and 24.92% workers are involved in Marginal activity providing livelihood for less than 6 months.

== Education ==
Amardeep Singh Shergill Memorial college Mukandpur and Sikh National College Banga are the nearest colleges. Lovely Professional University is 36.5 kilometres (22.7 mi) away from the village.

List of schools nearby:

- Sat Modern Public School, Mangat Dingrian
- Guru Teg Bahadur Model School, Behram
- Guru Ram Dass Public School, Cheta
- Lovely Public School, Pathlawa

== Transport ==
Banga railway station is the nearest train station however, Garhshankar Junction railway station is 25 kilometres (16 mi) away from the village. Sahnewal Airport is the nearest domestic airport which located 57 kilometres (35 mi) away in Ludhiana and the nearest international airport is located in Chandigarh also Sri Guru Ram Dass Jee International Airport is the second nearest airport which is 147 kilometres (91 mi) away in Amritsar.

== See also ==
- List of villages in India
