= Salempur, Saran =

Salempur is a small village situated near the city of Chhapra, within Saran district in the state of Bihar, India. The nearest railway station is Tekniwas and the nearest railway junction is Chhapra.
