= Paragpur =

- Village
- Location in Punjab, India Paragpur (India)
- Coordinates: 31.0982908°N 75.9810496°E
- Country: India
- State: Punjab
- District: Shaheed Bhagat Singh Nagar

Government
  - Type: Panchayat raj
  - Body: Gram panchayat
- Elevation: 251 m (823 ft)

Population (2011)
  - Total: 574
- Sex ratio 283/291 ♂/♀

Languages
  - Official: Punjabi
- Time zone: UTC+5:30 (IST)
- PIN: 144507
- Telephone code: 01823
- ISO 3166 code: IN-PB
- Post office: Mukandpur
- Website: nawanshahr.nic.in

Paragpur is a village in Shaheed Bhagat Singh Nagar district of Punjab, It is located 8 kilometres (5.0 mi) away from postal head office Mukandpur, 11 kilometres (6.8 mi) from Banga, 15.3 kilometres (9.5 mi) from district headquarter Shaheed Bhagat Singh Nagar and 106 kilometres (66 mi) from state capital Chandigarh. The village is service by a post office in nearby village Jhingran. The village is administrated by Sarpanch an elected representative of the village.

== Demography ==
As of 2011, Paragpur has a total number of 114 houses and population of 574 of which 283 include are males while 291 are females according to the report published by Census India in 2011. The literacy rate of Paragpur is 80.28%, higher than the state average of 75.84%. The population of children under the age of 6 years is 67 which is 11.67% of total population of Paragpur, and child sex ratio is approximately 1233 as compared to Punjab state average of 846.

Most of the people are from Schedule Caste which constitutes 76.83% of total population in Paragpur. The town does not have any Schedule Tribe population so far.

As per the report published by Census India in 2011, 161 people were engaged in work activities out of the total population of Paragpur which includes 151 males and 10 females. According to census survey report 2011, 79.50% workers describe their work as main work and 20.50% workers are involved in Marginal activity providing livelihood for less than 6 months.

== Education ==
The village has a Punjabi medium, co-ed primary school founded in 1972. The schools provide mid-day meal as per Indian Midday Meal Scheme. As per Right of Children to Free and Compulsory Education Act the school provide free education to children between the ages of 6 and 14.

Sikh National College Banga and Amardeep Singh Shergill Memorial college Mukandpur are the nearest colleges. Lovely Professional University is 37.5 kilometres (23.3 mi) away from the village.

== Landmarks and history ==
The village has a historical dargah Panj Peer dedicated to the five peers. It was earlier ruled by Mughals. The dargah is nearby the Sikh shrine Gurudwara Shri Panj Tirath Sahib which was named by Guru Hargobind and it was built by Maharaja Ranjit Singh the boundary of Paragpur & nearby village Laroya. A religious fair held at the dargah annually which attended by people of all religions.

== Transport ==
Banga train station is the nearest train station however, Nawanshahr railway station is 15.3 kilometres (9.5 mi) away from the village. Sahnewal Airport is the nearest domestic airport which located 54 kilometres (34 mi) away in Ludhiana and the nearest international airport is located in Chandigarh also Sri Guru Ram Dass Jee International Airport is the second nearest airport which is 150 kilometres (93 mi) away in Amritsar.

== See also ==
- List of villages in India
