= Johal, Phillaur =

Johal
- Village
- Location in Punjab, India Johal (India)
- Coordinates: 31.1069664°N 75.7560474°E
- Country: India
- State: Punjab
- District: Jalandhar

Government
  - Type: Panchayat raj
  - Body: Gram panchayat
- Elevation: 240 m (790 ft)

Population (2011)
  - Total: 1,187
- Sex ratio 632/555 ♂/♀

Languages
  - Official: Punjabi
- Time zone: UTC+5:30 (IST)
- PIN: 144418
- Telephone: 01826
- ISO 3166 code: IN-PB
- Vehicle registration: PB- 08
- Post office: Bara Pind
- Website: jalandhar.nic.in

Johal is a village in Jalandhar district of Punjab State, India. It is located 8 km away from Goraya, 17.4 km from Phillaur, 41.6 km from district headquarter Jalandhar and 126 km from state capital Chandigarh. The village is administrated by a sarpanch who is an elected representative of village.

== Education ==
The village has a Punjabi medium, co-ed primary school (GPS Johal). The school provide mid-day meal as per Indian Midday Meal Scheme and the meal prepared in school premises and it was found in 1955.

== Demography ==
According to the 2011 Census of India, Johal had 228 houses and a population of 1187, of which 632 were males and 555 females. The literacy rate was 78.23%, higher than state average of 75.84%. The population of children under the age of 6 years was 112, which was 9.44% of the total population, and the child sex ratio was approximately 965, higher than state average of 846. 63.52% of the village population was classified as Scheduled Caste; there were no Scheduled Tribe people.

As per census 2011, 332 people were engaged in work activities, being 321 males and 11 females. 70.78% workers described their work as main work and 29.22% workers are involved in marginal activity providing livelihood for less than 6 months.

== Transport ==
Goraya railway station is the nearest train station; however, Phagwara Junction train station is 15.4 km away from the village. The village is 48.5 km away from domestic airport in Ludhiana and the nearest international airport is located in Chandigarh also Sri Guru Ram Dass Jee International Airport is the second nearest airport which is 126 km away in Amritsar.
