= Nangal Shama =

- Village
- Location in Punjab, India Nangal Shama (India)
- Coordinates: 31°19′34″N 75°38′21″E
- Country: India
- State: Punjab
- District: Jalandhar
- Tehsil: Jalandhar - I

Government
  - Type: Panchayat raj
  - Body: Gram panchayat

Area
  - Total: 118 ha (290 acres)

Population (2011)
  - Total: 1,493; 768/725 ♂/♀
  - Scheduled Castes: 692; 355/337 ♂/♀
  - Total Households: 310

Languages
  - Official: Punjabi
- Time zone: UTC+5:30 (IST)
- ISO 3166 code: IN-PB
- Vehicle registration: PB-08
- Website: jalandhar.gov.in

Nangal Shama is a village in Jalandhar - I in Jalandhar district of Punjab State, India. It is located 5 kilometres (3.1 mi) from district headquarter. The village is administrated by Sarpanch an elected representative of the village.

== Demography ==
As of 2011, the village has a total number of 310 houses and a population of 1493 of which 768 are males while 725 are females. According to the report published by Census India in 2011, out of the total population of the village 692 people are from Schedule Caste and the village does not have any Schedule Tribe population so far.

== See also ==
- List of villages in India
