= Sangowal =

- Village
- Location in Punjab, India Sangowal (India)
- Coordinates: 30.998330°N 75.652084°E
- Country: India
- State: Punjab
- District: Kapurthala

Government
  - Type: Panchayati raj (India)
  - Body: Gram panchayat

Population (2011)
  - Total: 534
- Sex ratio 287/247♂/♀

Languages
  - Official: Punjabi
  - Other spoken: Hindi
- Time zone: UTC+5:30 (IST)
- PIN: 144804
- Telephone code: 01822
- ISO 3166 code: IN-PB
- Vehicle registration: PB-09
- Website: kapurthala.gov.in

Sangowal is a village in Kapurthala district of Punjab State, India. It is located 22 kilometres (14 mi) from Kapurthala, which is both district and sub-district headquarters of Sangowal. The village is administrated by a Sarpanch who is an elected representative of village as per the constitution of India and Panchayati raj (India).

Dhilwan, Nadala, Rayya-6, Kapurthala are nearest Taluks and Kapurthala, Kartarpur, Jalandhar, Qadian are the nearby Cities to Sangowal. Kapurthala, Jalandhar, Tarn Taran and Amritsar are the nearby District Headquarters to the village.

== Transport ==
=== Train ===
Dhilwan Railway Station- 2 km, Beas Railway Station- 5 km, Baba Bakalaraya- 10 km and Hamira- 12 km are nearest railway stations to Sangowal however, Jalandhar City major railway station is 34 km away from the village.

=== Air ===
Raja Sansi airport:- 61 km, Pathankot airport:- 92 km, Ludhiana airport:- 94 km and Gaggal airport:- 137 km nearest airports are available to Sangowal village.

== Air travel connectivity ==
The closest airport to the village is Sri Guru Ram Dass Jee International Airport.
