= Johal =

Indian surname

Johal is a surname and clan found among the Jats of Punjab, India. Notable persons with the surname include:

- Ashvir Singh Johal, English professional football coach
- Balinder Johal, Indian-born Canadian actress
- Bindy Johal (1971–1998), Indian-born Canadian gangster
- Gurnaik Johal, British writer
- Hardial Singh Johal (c. 1947–2002), Indian-Canadian engineer
- Yogi Johl, Canadian Olympic wrestler
- Jagbir Jhutti Johal, British professor of religion
- Jas Johal, Indian-born Canadian politician
- Kuldesh Johal (born 1980), English snooker player
- Nachhatar Singh Johal (born 1979), Indian sailor
- Sardara Singh Johl (born 1928), Indian agriculture economist
