= Khurdpur =

- Village
- Location in Punjab, India Khurdpur (India)
- Coordinates: 31.4359956°N 75.7215715°E
- Country: India
- State: Punjab
- District: Jalandhar

Government
  - Type: Panchayat raj
  - Body: Gram panchayat
- Elevation: 240 m (790 ft)

Languages
  - Official: Punjabi
- Time zone: UTC+5:30 (IST)
- ISO 3166 code: IN-PB
- Website: jalandhar.nic.in

Khurdpur is a village in Jalandhar district of Punjab, India. It is located 24 kilometres (15 mi) from the district headquarters (Jalandhar) and 158 kilometres (98 mi) from the state capital (Chandigarh). The village is administered by a sarpanch, who is an elected representative of village as per Panchayati raj (India).

== See also ==
- List of villages in India
