= Daroli Kalan =

- Village
- Location in Punjab, India Daroli Kalan (India)
- Coordinates: 31°25′N 75°47′E
- Country: India
- State: Punjab
- District: Jalandhar
- Tehsil: Jalandhar - I

Government
  - Type: Panchayat raj
  - Body: Gram panchayat

Area
  - Total: 1,212 ha (2,990 acres)

Population (2011)
  - Total: 4,767; 2,320/2,447 ♂/♀
  - Scheduled Castes: 1,220; 608/612 ♂/♀
  - Total Households: 1,124

Languages
  - Official: Punjabi
- Time zone: UTC+5:30 (IST)
- PIN: 144104
- ISO 3166 code: IN-PB
- Vehicle registration: PB-08
- Post office: Daroli Kalan S.O
- Website: jalandhar.gov.in

Daroli Kalan (Daroli Kalan & Daroli Khurd) is a village in Jalandhar - I in Jalandhar district of Punjab State, India. Kalan is Persian language word which means Big and Khurd is Persian word which means small when two villages have same name then it is distinguished with Kalan means Big and Khurd means Small used with Village Name. It is located 30 kilometres (19 mi) from district headquarter. The village is administrated by Sarpanch an elected representative of the village.

== Demography ==
As of 2011, the village has a total number of 1124 houses and a population of 4767 of which 2320 are males while 2447 are females. According to the report published by Census India in 2011, out of the total population of the village 1220 people are from Schedule Caste and the village does not have any Schedule Tribe population so far.

== See also ==
- List of villages in India
