= Jiwan =

Jiwan may refer to:

- Jiwan Luitel, Nepali film actor
- Kim Jiwan, South Korean professional basketball player
- Hari Jiwan Singh Khalsa, prominent American Sikh
- Bhai Jiwan Singh, Majhabi Sikh General
- Jiwan Singh Umranangal, Indian politician belonging to the Akali Dal
- Sukh Jiwan Mal, Raja of Kashmir

== Other ==
- Jiwan Pur
- Mera Jiwan
- Nangal Jiwan
- Jiwan Nangal
- Radio Naya Jiwan
- Jiwan Kada Ki Phool

== See also ==
- Jivan
