= Shah Shamas =

Coordinates: 31°55′N 75°05′E

- Village
- Interactive map of Shah Shamas
- Country: India
- State: Punjab
- District: Gurdaspur
- Tehsil: Dera Baba Nanak
- Region: Majha

Government
  - Type: Panchayat raj
  - Body: Gram panchayat

Area
  - Total: 193 ha (480 acres)

Population (2011)
  - Total: 628; 314/314 ♂/♀
  - Scheduled Castes: 55; 28/27 ♂/♀
  - Total Households: 128

Languages
  - Official: Punjabi
- Time zone: UTC+5:30 (IST)
- Telephone: 01871
- ISO 3166 code: IN-PB
- Website: gurdaspur.nic.in

Shah Shamas is a village in Dera Baba Nanak in Gurdaspur district of Punjab, India. The village is administrated by a sarpanch (village council).

== Demography ==
As of 2011, the village had 128 houses and a population of 628 (314 males and 314 females). According to Census India in 2011 55 people were from Scheduled Caste and the village did not have any members of Scheduled Tribe.

== See also ==
- List of villages in India
