= Khasanwala =

- Village
- Country: India
- State: Punjab
- District: Gurdaspur
- Tehsil: Dera Baba Nanak
- Region: Majha

Government
  - Type: Panchayat raj
  - Body: Gram panchayat

Area
  - Total: 111 ha (270 acres)

Population (2011)
  - Total: 1,303; 667/636 ♂/♀
  - Scheduled Castes: 14; 9/5 ♂/♀
  - Total Households: 276

Languages
  - Official: Punjabi
- Time zone: UTC+5:30 (IST)
- Telephone: 01871
- ISO 3166 code: IN-PB
- Website: gurdaspur.nic.in

Khasanwala is a village in Dera Baba Nanak in Gurdaspur district of Punjab State, India. It is located 0.5 kilometres (0.31 mi) from sub district headquarter and 40 kilometres (25 mi) from district headquarter. The village is administrated by Sarpanch an elected representative of the village.

== Demography ==
As of 2011, the village has a total number of 276 houses and a population of 1303 of which 667 are males while 636 are females. According to the report published by Census India in 2011, out of the total population of the village 14 people are from Schedule Caste and the village does not have any Schedule Tribe population so far.

== See also ==
- List of villages in India
