= Kahlanwali =

- Village
- Country: India
- State: Punjab
- District: Gurdaspur
- Tehsil: Dera Baba Nanak
- Region: Majha

Government
  - Type: Panchayat raj
  - Body: Gram panchayat

Area
  - Total: 183 ha (450 acres)

Population (2011)
  - Total: 1,322; 692/630 ♂/♀
  - Scheduled Castes: 213; 106/107 ♂/♀
  - Total Households: 231

Languages
  - Official: Punjabi
- Time zone: UTC+5:30 (IST)
- Telephone: 01871
- ISO 3166 code: IN-PB
- Website: gurdaspur.nic.in

Kahlanwali is a village in Dera Baba Nanak in Gurdaspur district of Punjab State, India. It is located 2 kilometres (1.2 mi) from sub district headquarter and 41 kilometres (25 mi) from district headquarter. The village is administrated by Sarpanch an elected representative of the village.

== Demography ==
As of 2011, the village has a total number of 231 houses and a population of 1322 of which 692 are males while 630 are females. According to the report published by Census India in 2011, out of the total population of the village 213 people are from Schedule Caste and the village does not have any Schedule Tribe population so far.

== See also ==
- List of villages in India
