= Mahlowali =

Coordinates: 31°57′N 75°02′E

- Village
- Interactive map of Mahlowali
- Country: India
- State: Punjab
- District: Gurdaspur
- Tehsil: Dera Baba Nanak
- Region: Majha

Government
  - Type: Panchayat raj
  - Body: Gram panchayat

Area
  - Total: 174 ha (430 acres)

Population (2011)
  - Total: 729; 382/347 ♂/♀
  - Scheduled Castes: 328; 176/152 ♂/♀
  - Total Households: 130

Languages
  - Official: Punjabi
- Time zone: UTC+5:30 (IST)
- Telephone: 01871
- ISO 3166 code: IN-PB
- Website: gurdaspur.nic.in

Mahlowali is a village in Dera Baba Nanak in Gurdaspur district of Punjab State, India. It is located 22 kilometres (14 mi) from sub district headquarter and 40 kilometres (25 mi) from district headquarter. The village is administrated by Sarpanch an elected representative of the village.

== Demography ==
As of 2011, the village has a total number of 130 houses and a population of 729 of which 382 are males while 347 are females. According to the report published by Census India in 2011, out of the total population of the village 328 people are from Schedule Caste and the village does not have any Schedule Tribe population so far.

== See also ==
- List of villages in India
