= Lallowal =

- Village
- Country: India
- State: Punjab
- District: Gurdaspur
- Tehsil: Dera Baba Nanak
- Region: Majha

Government
  - Type: Panchayat raj
  - Body: Gram panchayat

Area
  - Total: 168 ha (420 acres)

Population (2011)
  - Total: 648; 330/318♂/♀
  - Scheduled Castes: 75; 33/42 ♂/♀
  - Total Households: 136

Languages
  - Official: Punjabi
- Time zone: UTC+5:30 (IST)
- Telephone: 01871
- ISO 3166 code: IN-PB
- Website: gurdaspur.nic.in

Lallowal (or Laluwal) is a village in Dera Baba Nanak in Gurdaspur district of Punjab State, India. It is located 16 kilometres (9.9 mi) from sub district headquarter and 53 kilometres (33 mi) from district headquarter. The village is administrated by Sarpanch an elected representative of the village.

== Demography ==
As of 2011, the village has a total number of 136 houses and a population of 648 of which 330 are males while 318 are females. According to the report published by Census India in 2011, out of the total population of the village 75 people are from Schedule Caste and the village does not have any Schedule Tribe population so far.

== See also ==
- List of villages in India
