= Gazi Nangal =

- Village
- Country: India
- State: Punjab
- District: Gurdaspur
- Tehsil: Dera Baba Nanak
- Region: Majha

Government
  - Type: Panchayat raj
  - Body: Gram panchayat

Area
  - Total: 170 ha (420 acres)

Population (2011)
  - Total: 721; 372/349 ♂/♀
  - Scheduled Castes: 206; 108/98 ♂/♀
  - Total Households: 133

Languages
  - Official: Punjabi
- Time zone: UTC+5:30 (IST)
- Telephone: 01871
- ISO 3166 code: IN-PB
- Website: gurdaspur.nic.in

Gazi Nangal is a village in Dera Baba Nanak in Gurdaspur district of Punjab State, India. It is located 9 kilometres (5.6 mi) from sub district headquarter and 45 kilometres (28 mi) from district headquarter. The village is administrated by Sarpanch an elected representative of the village.

== Demography ==
As of 2011, The village has a total number of 133 houses and the population of 721 of which 372 are males while 349 are females. According to the report published by Census India in 2011, out of the total population of the village 206 people are from Schedule Caste and the village does not have any Schedule Tribe population so far.

== See also ==
- List of villages in India
