= Nabi Nagar =

- Village
- Country: India
- State: Punjab
- District: Gurdaspur
- Tehsil: Dera Baba Nanak
- Region: Majha

Government
  - Type: Panchayat raj
  - Body: Gram panchayat

Area
  - Total: 194 ha (480 acres)

Population (2011)
  - Total: 521; 289/232 ♂/♀
  - Scheduled Castes: 86; 52/34 ♂/♀
  - Total Households: 97

Languages
  - Official: Punjabi
- Time zone: UTC+5:30 (IST)
- Telephone: 01871
- ISO 3166 code: IN-PB
- Website: gurdaspur.nic.in

Nabi Nagar is a village in Dera Baba Nanak in Gurdaspur district of Punjab State, India. It is located 14 kilometres (8.7 mi) from sub district headquarter and 50 kilometres (31 mi) from district headquarter. The village is administrated by Sarpanch an elected representative of the village.

== Demography ==
As of 2011, the village has a total number of 97 houses and a population of 521 of which 289 are males while 232 are females. According to the report published by Census India in 2011, out of the total population of the village 86 people are from Schedule Caste and the village does not have any Schedule Tribe population so far.

== See also ==
- List of villages in India
