= Gujjran =

Qadian Gujjran
- Village
- Country: India
- State: Punjab
- District: Gurdaspur
- Tehsil: Dera Baba Nanak
- Region: Majha

Government
  - Type: Panchayat raj
  - Body: Gram panchayat

Area
  - Total: 206 ha (510 acres)

Population (2011)
  - Total: 601; 293/308 ♂/♀
  - Scheduled Castes: 298; 133/165 ♂/♀
  - Total Households: 116

Languages
  - Official: Punjabi
- Time zone: UTC+5:30 (IST)
- Telephone: 01871
- ISO 3166 code: IN-PB
- Website: gurdaspur.nic.in

Qadian Gujjran is a village in Dera Baba Nanak in Gurdaspur district of Punjab State, India. It is located 8 kilometres (5.0 mi) from sub district headquarter and 34 kilometres (21 mi) from district headquarter. The village is administrated by Sarpanch an elected representative of the village.

== Demography ==
As of 2011, the village has a total number of 116 houses and a population of 601 of which 293 are males while 308 are females. According to the report published by Census India in 2011, out of the total population of the village 298 people are from Schedule Caste and the village does not have any Schedule Tribe population so far.

== See also ==
- List of villages in India
