= Shahpur Jajan =

Shahpur Jajan Baba Budha Sahib Nagar
- Town/city
- Location within Punjab Location within India
- Coordinates: 31.9632656°N 75.0118640°E subdivision_type = Country
- State: Punjab
- District: Gurdaspur
- Tehsil: Dera Baba Nanak
- Region: Majha

Government
  - Type: Panchayat raj
  - Body: Gram panchayat

Area
  - Total: 29.97 km^{2} (11.57 sq mi)

Population (2011)
  - Total: 4,374; 2,276/2,098 ♂/♀
  - Scheduled Castes: 335; 185/ 150♂/♀
  - Total Households: 806

Languages
  - Official: Punjabi
- Time zone: UTC+5:30 (IST)
- Telephone: 01871
- ISO 3166 code: IN-PB
- Website: gurdaspur.nic.in

Shahpur Jajan (Baba Budha Sahib Nagar) is a town in Gurdaspur district of Punjab State, India. It is located 6 kilometres (3.7 mi) from sub district headquarter Dera Baba Nanak and 46 kilometres (29 mi) from district headquarter Gurdaspur. The town is administrated by Sarpanch, an elected representative of the town. Shahpur Jajan is divided into four wards, each electing a sarpanch. These wards include Rampur, Shampur, Main Shahpur Jajan, and Kila. Shahpur Jajan is also referred to as Shahpur Purbiyan. Gurdwara Sri Kothri Sahib is its main philosophical site.

== Demography ==
As of 2011, the town has a total number of 806 houses and a population of 4,374 of which 2,276 are males and 2,098 are females. According to Census of India in 2011, out of the total population of the town 335 people are from Schedule Caste and the town does not have any Scheduled Tribe population so far.
