= Kotli Viran =

- Village
- Country: India
- State: Punjab
- District: Gurdaspur
- Tehsil: Dera Baba Nanak
- Region: Majha

Government
  - Type: Panchayat raj
  - Body: Gram panchayat

Area
  - Total: 69 ha (170 acres)

Population (2011)
  - Total: 208; 113/95 ♂/♀
  - Scheduled Castes: 0; 0/0 ♂/♀
  - Total Households: 37

Languages
  - Official: Punjabi
- Time zone: UTC+5:30 (IST)
- Telephone: 01871
- ISO 3166 code: IN-PB
- Website: gurdaspur.nic.in

Kotli Viran is a village in Dera Baba Nanak in Gurdaspur district of Punjab State, India. It is located 13 kilometres (8.1 mi) from sub district headquarter and 53 kilometres (33 mi) from district headquarter. The village is administrated by Sarpanch an elected representative of the village.

== Demography ==
As of 2011, the village has a total number of 37 houses and a population of 208 of which 113 are males while 95 are females. According to the report published by Census India in 2011, out of the total population of the village 0 people are from Schedule Caste and the village does not have any Schedule Tribe population so far.

== See also ==
- List of villages in India
