= Lakmanian =

- Village
- Country: India
- State: Punjab
- District: Gurdaspur
- Tehsil: Dera Baba Nanak
- Region: Majha

Government
  - Type: Panchayat raj
  - Body: Gram panchayat

Area
  - Total: 154 ha (380 acres)

Population (2011)
  - Total: 581; 300/281 ♂/♀
  - Scheduled Castes: 24; 12/12 ♂/♀
  - Total Households: 106

Languages
  - Official: Punjabi
- Time zone: UTC+5:30 (IST)
- Telephone: 01871
- ISO 3166 code: IN-PB
- Website: gurdaspur.nic.in

Lakmanian is a village in Dera Baba Nanak in Gurdaspur district of Punjab State, India. It is located 20 kilometres (12 mi) from sub district headquarter and 55 kilometres (34 mi) from district headquarter. The village is administrated by Sarpanch an elected representative of the village.

== Demography ==
As of 2011, the village has a total number of 106 houses and a population of 581 of which 300 are males while 281 are females. According to the report published by Census India in 2011, out of the total population of the village 24 people are from Schedule Caste and the village does not have any Schedule Tribe population so far.

== See also ==
- List of villages in India
