= Kathiala =

- Village
- Country: India
- State: Punjab
- District: Gurdaspur
- Tehsil: Dera Baba Nanak
- Region: Majha

Government
  - Type: Panchayat raj
  - Body: Gram panchayat

Area
  - Total: 437 ha (1,080 acres)

Population (2011)
  - Total: 991; 512/479 ♂/♀
  - Scheduled Castes: 202; 101/101 ♂/♀
  - Total Households: 183

Languages
  - Official: Punjabi
- Time zone: UTC+5:30 (IST)
- Telephone: 01871
- ISO 3166 code: IN-PB
- Website: gurdaspur.nic.in

Kathiala is a village in Dera Baba Nanak in Gurdaspur district of Punjab State, India. It is located 12 kilometres (7.5 mi) from sub district headquarter and 52 kilometres (32 mi) from district headquarter. The village is administrated by Sarpanch an elected representative of the village.

== Demography ==
As of 2011, the village has a total number of 183 houses and a population of 991 of which 512 are males while 479 are females. According to the report published by Census India in 2011, out of the total population of the village 202 people are from Schedule Caste and the village does not have any Schedule Tribe population so far.

== See also ==
- List of villages in India
