= Gola Dhola =

- Village
- Country: India
- State: Punjab
- District: Gurdaspur
- Tehsil: Dera Baba Nanak
- Region: Majha

Government
  - Type: Panchayat raj
  - Body: Gram Panchayat
  - Sarpanch: Nidhi Sharma w/o Rajkumar Sharma

Area
  - Total: 285 ha (700 acres)

Population (2011)
  - Total: 247; 133/114 ♂/♀
  - Scheduled Castes: 1; 0/1 ♂/♀
  - Total Households: 44

Languages
  - Official: Punjabi
- Time zone: UTC+5:30 (IST)
- Telephone: 01871
- ISO 3166 code: IN-PB
- Website: gurdaspur.nic.in

Gola Dhola is a village in Dera Baba Nanak in Gurdaspur district of Punjab State, India. It is located 8 kilometres (5.0 mi) from sub district headquarter and 48 kilometres (30 mi) from district headquarter. The village is administrated by Sarpanch an elected representative of the village. The last Sarpanch was late Rajkumar Sharma now followed by his wife Nidhi Sharma.

== Demography ==
As of 2011, the village has a total number of 44 houses and a population of 247 of which 133 are males while 114 are females. According to the report published by Census India in 2011, out of the total population of the village 1 person is from Schedule Caste and the village does not have any Schedule Tribe population so far.

== See also ==
- List of villages in India
