= Dargawal =

Coordinates: 31°57′N 75°08′E

- Village
- Interactive map of Dargawal
- Country: India
- State: Punjab
- District: Gurdaspur
- Tehsil: Dera Baba Nanak
- Region: Majha

Government
  - Type: Panchayat raj
  - Body: Gram panchayat

Area
  - Total: 160 ha (400 acres)

Population (2011)
  - Total: 1,511; 762/749 ♂/♀
  - Scheduled Castes: 23; 12/11 ♂/♀
  - Total Households: 286

Languages
  - Official: Punjabi
- Time zone: UTC+5:30 (IST)
- Telephone: 01871
- ISO 3166 code: IN-PB
- Website: gurdaspur.nic.in

Dargawal is a village in Dera Baba Nanak in Gurdaspur district of Punjab State, India. It is located 13 kilometres (8.1 mi) from sub district headquarter and 54 kilometres (34 mi) from district headquarter. The village is administrated by Sarpanch an elected representative of the village.

== Demography ==
As of 2011, the village has a total number of 286 houses and a population of 1511 of which 762 are males while 749 are females. According to the report published by Census India in 2011, out of the total population of the village 23 people are from Schedule Caste and the village does not have any Schedule Tribe population so far.

== See also ==
- List of villages in India
