= Nikko Sarai =

- Village
- Country: India
- State: Punjab
- District: Gurdaspur
- Tehsil: Dera Baba Nanak
- Region: Majha

Government
  - Type: Panchayat raj
  - Body: Gram panchayat

Area
  - Total: 319 ha (790 acres)

Population (2011)
  - Total: 1,972; 1,021/951 ♂/♀
  - Scheduled Castes: 771; 415/356 ♂/♀
  - Total Households: 401

Languages
  - Official: Punjabi
- Time zone: UTC+5:30 (IST)
- Telephone: 01871
- ISO 3166 code: IN-PB
- Website: gurdaspur.nic.in

Nikko Sarai is a village in Dera Baba Nanak in Gurdaspur district of Punjab State, India. It is located 10 kilometres (6.2 mi) from sub district headquarter and 40 kilometres (25 mi) from district headquarter. The village is administrated by Sarpanch s.nishan singh (2023)an elected representative of the village.

== Demography ==
As of 2011, the village has a total number of 401 houses and a population of 1972 of which 1021 are males while 951 are females. According to the report published by Census India in 2011, out of the total population of the village 771 people are from Schedule Caste and the village does not have any Schedule Tribe population so far.

== See also ==
- List of villages in India
