= Khaira Sultan =

- Village
- Country: India
- State: Punjab
- District: Gurdaspur
- Tehsil: Dera Baba Nanak
- Region: Majha

Government
  - Type: Panchayat raj
  - Body: Gram panchayat

Area
  - Total: 138 ha (340 acres)

Population (2011)
  - Total: 1,330; 704/626 ♂/♀
  - Scheduled Castes: 168; 86/82 ♂/♀
  - Total Households: 278

Languages
  - Official: Punjabi
- Time zone: UTC+5:30 (IST)
- Telephone: 01871
- ISO 3166 code: IN-PB
- Website: gurdaspur.nic.in

Khaira Sultan is a village in Dera Baba Nanak in Gurdaspur district of Punjab State, India. It is located 16 kilometres (9.9 mi) from sub district headquarter and 58 kilometres (36 mi) from district headquarter. The village is administrated by Sarpanch an elected representative of the village.

== Demography ==
As of 2011, the village has a total number of 278 houses and a population of 1330 of which 704 are males while 626 are females. According to the report published by Census India in 2011, out of the total population of the village 168 people are from Schedule Caste and the village does not have any Schedule Tribe population so far.

== See also ==
- List of villages in India
