= Thetharke =

- Village
- Country: India
- State: Punjab
- District: Gurdaspur
- Tehsil: Dera Baba Nanak
- Region: Majha

Government
  - Type: Panchayat raj
  - Body: Gram panchayat

Area
  - Total: 489 ha (1,210 acres)

Population (2011)
  - Total: 1,989; 1,066/923 ♂/♀
  - Scheduled Castes: 139; 70/69 ♂/♀
  - Total Households: 374

Languages
  - Official: Punjabi
- Time zone: UTC+5:30 (IST)
- Telephone: 01871
- ISO 3166 code: IN-PB
- Website: gurdaspur.nic.in

Thetharke is a village in Dera Baba Nanak in Gurdaspur district of Punjab State, India. It is located 2 kilometres (1.2 mi) from sub district headquarter and 44 kilometres (27 mi) from district headquarter. The village is administrated by Sarpanch an elected representative of the village.

== Demography ==
As of 2011, the village has a total number of 374 houses and a population of 1989 of which 1066 are males while 923 are females. According to the report published by Census India in 2011, out of the total population of the village 139 people are from Schedule Caste and the village does not have any Schedule Tribe population so far.

== See also ==
- List of villages in India
