= Shezada =

- Village
- Country: India
- State: Punjab
- District: Gurdaspur
- Tehsil: Dera Baba Nanak
- Region: Majha

Government
  - Type: Panchayat raj
  - Body: Gram panchayat

Area
  - Total: 530 ha (1,300 acres)

Population (2011)
  - Total: 837; 438/399 ♂/♀
  - Scheduled Castes: 148; 73/75 ♂/♀
  - Total Households: 161

Languages
  - Official: Punjabi
- Time zone: UTC+5:30 (IST)
- Telephone: 01871
- ISO 3166 code: IN-PB
- Website: gurdaspur.nic.in

Shezada is a village in Dera Baba Nanak in Gurdaspur district of Punjab State, India. It is located 8 kilometres (5.0 mi) from sub district headquarter and 47 kilometres (29 mi) from district headquarter. The village is administrated by Sarpanch an elected representative of the village.

== Demography ==
As of 2011, the village has a total number of 161 houses and a population of 837 of which 438 are males while 399 are females. According to the report published by Census India in 2011, out of the total population of the village 148 people are from Schedule Caste and the village does not have any Schedule Tribe population so far.

== See also ==
- List of villages in India
