= Chandu Nangal =

- Village
- Interactive map of Chandu Nangal
- Coordinates: 32°01′39.50″N 75°01′38.30″E
- Country: India
- State: Punjab
- District: Gurdaspur
- Tehsil: Dera Baba Nanak
- Region: Majha

Government
  - Type: Panchayat raj
  - Body: Gram panchayat

Area
  - Total: 58 ha (140 acres)

Population (2011)
  - Total: 336; 171/165 ♂/♀
  - Scheduled Castes: 145; 75/70 ♂/♀
  - Total Households: 63

Languages
  - Official: Punjabi
- Time zone: UTC+5:30 (IST)
- Telephone: 01871
- ISO 3166 code: IN-PB
- Website: gurdaspur.nic.in

Chandu Nangal is a village in Dera Baba Nanak in Gurdaspur district of Punjab State, India. It is located 1 kilometre (0.62 mi) from sub district headquarter and 40 kilometres (25 mi) from district headquarter. The village is administrated by Sarpanch an elected representative of the village.

== Demography ==
As of 2011, the village has a total number of 63 houses and a population of 336 of which 171 are males while 165 are females. According to the report published by Census India in 2011, out of the total population of the village 145 people are from Schedule Caste and the village does not have any Schedule Tribe population so far.

== See also ==
- List of villages in India
