= Raimal =

- Village
- Country: India
- State: Punjab
- District: Gurdaspur
- Tehsil: Dera Baba Nanak
- Region: Majha

Government
  - Type: Panchayat raj
  - Body: Gram panchayat

Area
  - Total: 126 ha (310 acres)

Population (2011)
  - Total: 573; 304/269 ♂/♀
  - Scheduled Castes: 0; 0/0 ♂/♀
  - Total Households: 112

Languages
  - Official: Punjabi
- Time zone: UTC+5:30 (IST)
- Telephone: 01871
- ISO 3166 code: IN-PB
- Website: gurdaspur.nic.in

Raimal is a village in Dera Baba Nanak in the Gurdaspur district of Punjab State, India. It is located 21 kilometres (13 mi) from the sub district headquarter and 40 kilometres (25 mi) from the district headquarter. The village is administrated by the Sarpanch, an elected representative of the village.

== Demography ==
As of 2011, the village has a total number of 112 houses and a population of 573 people, of which 304 are males and 269 are females. According to the report published by Census India in 2011, 0 people from the village are from Schedule Caste; the village does not have any Schedule Tribe population so far.

== See also ==
- List of villages in India
