= Ghanike Bet =

- Village
- Country: India
- State: Punjab
- District: Gurdaspur
- Tehsil: Dera Baba Nanak
- Region: Majha

Government
  - Type: Panchayat raj
  - Body: Gram panchayat

Area
  - Total: 816 ha (2,020 acres)

Population (2011)
  - Total: 582; 304/278 ♂/♀
  - Scheduled Castes: 11; 8/3 ♂/♀
  - Total Households: 107

Languages
  - Official: Punjabi
- Time zone: UTC+5:30 (IST)
- Telephone: 01871
- ISO 3166 code: IN-PB
- Website: gurdaspur.nic.in

Ghanike Bet is a village in Dera Baba Nanak in Gurdaspur district of Punjab State, India. It is located 13 kilometres (8.1 mi) from sub district headquarter and 53 kilometres (33 mi) from district headquarter. The village is administrated by Sarpanch an elected representative of the village.

== Demography ==
As of 2011, the village has a total number of 107 houses and a population of 582 of which 304 are males while 278 are females. According to the report published by Census India in 2011, out of the total population of the village 11 people are from Schedule Caste and the village does not have any Schedule Tribe population so far.

== See also ==
- List of villages in India
