= Mohal Nangal =

- Village
- Country: India
- State: Punjab
- District: Gurdaspur
- Tehsil: Dera Baba Nanak
- Region: Majha

Government
  - Type: Panchayat raj
  - Body: Gram panchayat

Area
  - Total: 82 ha (200 acres)

Population (2011)
  - Total: 272; 139/133 ♂/♀
  - Scheduled Castes: 0; 0/0 ♂/♀
  - Total Households: 51

Languages
  - Official: Punjabi
- Time zone: UTC+5:30 (IST)
- Telephone: 01871
- ISO 3166 code: IN-PB
- Website: gurdaspur.nic.in

Mohal Nangal is a village in Dera Baba Nanak in Gurdaspur district of Punjab State, India. It is located 3 kilometres (1.9 mi) from sub district headquarter and 40 kilometres (25 mi) from district headquarter. The village is administrated by Sarpanch an elected representative of the village.

== Demography ==
As of 2011, the village has a total number of 51 houses and a population of 272 of which 139 are males while 133 are females. According to the report published by Census India in 2011, out of the total population of the village 0 people are from Schedule Caste and the village does not have any Schedule Tribe population so far.

== See also ==
- List of villages in India
