= Kotli Surat Malhi =

- Village
- Country: India
- State: Punjab
- District: Gurdaspur
- Tehsil: Dera Baba Nanak
- Region: Majha

Government
  - Type: Panchayat raj
  - Body: Gram panchayat

Area
  - Total: 774 ha (1,910 acres)

Population (2011)
  - Total: 3,362; 1,777/1,585 ♂/♀
  - Scheduled Castes: 1,089; 556/533 ♂/♀
  - Total Households: 634

Languages
  - Official: Punjabi
- Time zone: UTC+5:30 (IST)
- Telephone: 01871
- ISO 3166 code: IN-PB
- Website: gurdaspur.nic.in

Kotli Surat Malhi is a village in Dera Baba Nanak in Gurdaspur district of Punjab State, India. It is located 12 kilometres (7.5 mi) from sub district headquarter and 55 kilometres (34 mi) from district headquarter. The village is administrated by Sarpanch an elected representative of the village.

== Demography ==
As of 2011, the village has a total number of 634 houses and a population of 3,362 of which 1,777 are males while 1,585 are females. According to the report published by Census India in 2011, out of the total population of the village 1,089 people are from Schedule Caste and the village does not have any Schedule Tribe population so far.

== Education ==
The list of major educational institutions in Kotli Surat Malhi is given below.

- Saint Francis Convent School, Kotli Surat Malhi
- Dashmesh Senior Secondary School
- Government Senior Secondary School Kotli Surat Malhi

== See also ==
- List of villages in India
