= Dharamkot Randhawa =

- Village
- Country: India
- State: Punjab
- District: Gurdaspur
- Tehsil: Dera Baba Nanak
- Region: Majha

Government
  - Type: Panchayat raj
  - Body: Gram panchayat

Area
  - Total: 48 ha (120 acres)

Population (2011)
  - Total: 2,995; 1,517/1,478 ♂/♀
  - Scheduled Castes: 473; 240/233 ♂/♀
  - Total Households: 513

Languages
  - Official: Punjabi
- Time zone: UTC+5:30 (IST)
- Telephone: 01871
- ISO 3166 code: IN-PB
- Website: gurdaspur.nic.in

Dharamkot Randhawa is a village in Dera Baba Nanak in Gurdaspur district of Punjab State, India. It is located 6 kilometres (3.7 mi) from sub district headquarter and 45 kilometres (28 mi) from district headquarter. The village is administrated by Sarpanch an elected representative of the village.

== Demography ==
As of 2011, the village has a total number of 513 houses and a population of 2995 of which 1517 are males while 1478 are females. According to the report published by Census India in 2011, out of the total population of the village 473 people are from Schedule Caste and the village does not have any Schedule Tribe population so far.

== See also ==
- List of villages in India
