= Bhagtana Tulianwala =

- Village
- Interactive map of Bhagtana Tulianwala
- Coordinates: 32°03′08.68″N 75°04′10.29″E
- Country: India
- State: Punjab
- District: Gurdaspur
- Tehsil: Dera Baba Nanak
- Region: Majha

Government
  - Type: Panchayat raj
  - Body: Gram panchayat

Area
  - Total: 259 ha (640 acres)

Population (2011)
  - Total: 1,047; 541/506 ♂/♀
  - Scheduled Castes: 244; 125/119 ♂/♀
  - Total Households: 184

Languages
  - Official: Punjabi
- Time zone: UTC+5:30 (IST)
- Telephone: 01871
- ISO 3166 code: IN-PB
- Website: gurdaspur.nic.in

Bhagtana Tulianwala is a village in Dera Baba Nanak in Gurdaspur district of Punjab State, India. It is located 10 kilometres (6.2 mi) from sub district headquarter and 46 kilometres (29 mi) from district headquarter. The village is administrated by Sarpanch an elected representative of the village. Before partition, this village's population belong to Naru Rajputs and Dogar families. Naru Rajput family's ancestor "Suhaila Khan" migrated to Bhagtana Tullianwala from "Sham Chaurasi" in Hoshiarpur district during time of Sikh rule in Punjab, after a quarrel with Sikh troops. The chief man of this family was "Chaudhry Laal Din" at the time of partition who was head of this village at that time.

== Demography ==
As of 2011, the village has a total number of 184 houses and a population of 1047 of which 541 are males while 506 are females. According to the report published by Census India in 2011, out of the total population of the village 244 people are from Schedule Caste and the village does not have any Schedule Tribe population so far.

== See also ==
- List of villages in India
