= Chakanwali =

Coordinates: 32°00′N 75°03′E

- Village
- Interactive map of Chakanwali
- Country: India
- State: Punjab
- District: Gurdaspur
- Tehsil: Dera Baba Nanak
- Region: Majha

Government
  - Type: Panchayat raj
  - Body: Gram panchayat

Area
  - Total: 85 ha (210 acres)

Population (2011)
  - Total: 300; 160/140 ♂/♀
  - Scheduled Castes: 0; 0/0 ♂/♀
  - Total Households: 57

Languages
  - Official: Punjabi
- Time zone: UTC+5:30 (IST)
- Telephone: 01871
- ISO 3166 code: IN-PB
- Website: gurdaspur.nic.in

Chakanwali is a village in Dera Baba Nanak in Gurdaspur district of Punjab State, India. It is located 6 kilometres (3.7 mi) from sub district headquarter and 43 kilometres (27 mi) from district headquarter. The village is administrated by Sarpanch an elected representative of the village.

== Demography ==
As of 2011, the village has a total number of 57 houses and a population of 300 of which 160 are males while 140 are females. According to the report published by Census India in 2011, out of the total population of the village 0 people are from Schedule Caste and the village does not have any Schedule Tribe population so far.

== See also ==
- List of villages in India
