= Haveli Khurd =

- Village
- Country: India
- State: Punjab
- District: Gurdaspur
- Tehsil: Dera Baba Nanak
- Region: Majha

Government
  - Type: Panchayat raj
  - Body: Gram panchayat

Area
  - Total: 18 ha (44 acres)

Population (2011)
  - Total: 147; 82/65 ♂/♀
  - Scheduled Castes: 11; 6/5 ♂/♀
  - Total Households: 24

Languages
  - Official: Punjabi
- Time zone: UTC+5:30 (IST)
- Telephone: 01871
- ISO 3166 code: IN-PB
- Website: gurdaspur.nic.in

Haveli Khurd is a village in Dera Baba Nanak in Gurdaspur district of Punjab State, India. It is located 8 kilometres (5.0 mi) from sub district headquarter and 45 kilometres (28 mi) from district headquarter. The village is administrated by Sarpanch an elected representative of the village.

== Demography ==
As of 2011, the village has a total number of 24 houses and a population of 147 of which 82 are males while 65 are females. According to the report published by Census India in 2011, out of the total population of the village 11 people are from Schedule Caste and the village does not have any Schedule Tribe population so far.

== See also ==
- List of villages in India
