= Shahpur Goraya =

- Village
- Country: India
- State: Punjab
- District: Gurdaspur
- Tehsil: Dera Baba Nanak
- Region: Majha

Government
  - Type: Panchayat raj
  - Body: Gram panchayat

Area
  - Total: 506 ha (1,250 acres)

Population (2011)
  - Total: 1,690; 874/816 ♂/♀
  - Scheduled Castes: 62; 29/33 ♂/♀
  - Total Households: 293

Languages
  - Official: Punjabi
- Time zone: UTC+5:30 (IST)
- Telephone: 01871
- ISO 3166 code: IN-PB
- Website: gurdaspur.nic.in

Shahpur Goraya is a village in Dera Baba Nanak in Gurdaspur district of Punjab State, India. It is located 8 kilometres (5.0 mi) from sub district headquarter and 33 kilometres (21 mi) from district headquarter. The village is administrated by Sarpanch an elected representative of the village.

== Demography ==
As of 2011, the village has a total number of 293 houses and a population of 1690 of which 874 are males while 816 are females. According to the report published by Census India in 2011, out of the total population of the village 62 people are from Schedule Caste and the village does not have any Schedule Tribe population so far.

== See also ==
- List of villages in India
