= Radio Naya Jiwan =

Fiji
- Frequencies: 94.6 MHz in Suva, Navua and Nausori

Programming
- Format: Christian

Ownership
- Owner: Evangelical Bible Mission Trust Board

History
- First air date: October 1, 2004

Links
- Webcast: http://nayajiwan.radio12345.com/
- Website: www.radiolight.org

Radio Naya Jiwan is a listener supported, Hindi language Christian, radio station in Fiji. The station broadcasts on the 94.6Mhz to the cities of Suva, Navua, Pacific Harbour, Lami, Nasinu, Nakasi and Nausori. The station also broadcasts online, and on smartphones through Listen2myradio Radio Mobile App as "Nayajiwan". The station is also available on "Simple Radio" app as Radio Naya Jiwan.

The annual fund-raising to operate the stations are done in February and September.

The station is operated by Evangelical Bible Mission Trust Board the organisation which also operates Radio Light and Na iTalai FM in Fiji. Radio Naya Jiwan was launched on 1 October 2004, with the mission to carry the message of The Christ to the Hindi and Urdu listeners in Fiji.

"Naya Jiwan" is translated into English as "New Life".
