= Rajeke =

Coordinates: 31°55′N 75°01′E

- Village
- Interactive map of Rajeke
- Country: India
- State: Punjab
- District: Gurdaspur
- Tehsil: Dera Baba Nanak
- Region: Majha

Government
  - Type: Panchayat raj
  - Body: Gram panchayat

Area
  - Total: 105 ha (260 acres)

Population (2011)
  - Total: 592; 320/272 ♂/♀
  - Scheduled Castes: 50; 25/25 ♂/♀
  - Total Households: 109

Languages
  - Official: Punjabi
- Time zone: UTC+5:30 (IST)
- Telephone: 01871
- ISO 3166 code: IN-PB
- Website: gurdaspur.nic.in

Rajeke is a village in Dera Baba Nanak in Gurdaspur district of Punjab State, India. It is located 16 kilometres (9.9 mi) from sub district headquarter and 40 kilometres (25 mi) from district headquarter. The village is administrated by Sarpanch an elected representative of the village.

== Demography ==
As of 2011, the village has a total number of 109 houses and a population of 592 of which 320 are males while 272 are females. According to the report published by Census India in 2011, out of the total population of the village 50 people are from Schedule Caste and the village does not have any Schedule Tribe population so far.

== See also ==
- List of villages in India
