= Bomb (village) =

Village in Gurdaspur district, Punjab, India

Coordinates: 31.933°N 75.030°E

Bomb is an Indian village in Dera Baba Nanak, Gurdaspur district, Punjab, India.

== Census 2011 data ==
Particulars	Total	Male	Female	Total No. of Houses	52	-	-
Population	254	127	127				
Child (0–6)	28	15	13				
Schedule Caste	0	0	0				
Schedule Tribe	0	0	0				
Literacy	85.40 %	92.86 %	78.07 %				
Total Workers	81	72	9				
Main Worker	80	0	0				
Marginal Worker	1	1	0				
