= Talwandi Rama =

- Village
- Location within Punjab Location within India
- Country: India
- State: Punjab
- District: Gurdaspur
- Tehsil: Dera Baba Nanak
- Region: Majha

Government
  - Type: Panchayat raj
  - Body: Gram panchayat

Area
  - Total: 413 ha (1,020 acres)

Population (2011)
  - Total: 2,433; 1,288/1,145 ♂/♀
  - Scheduled Castes: 287; 149/138 ♂/♀
  - Total Households: 458

Languages
  - Official: Punjabi
- Time zone: UTC+5:30 (IST)
- Telephone: 01871
- ISO 3166 code: IN-PB
- Website: gurdaspur.nic.in

Talwandi Rama is a village in Dera Baba Nanak in Gurdaspur district of Punjab State, India. It is located 10 kilometres (6.2 mi) from sub district headquarter and 40 kilometres (25 mi) from district headquarter. The village is administrated by Sarpanch an elected representative of the village.

== Demography ==
As of 2011, the village has a total number of 458 houses and a population of 2433 of which 1288 are males while 1145 are females. According to the report published by Census India in 2011, out of the total population of the village 287 people are from Schedule Caste and the village does not have any Schedule Tribe population so far.

== See also ==
- List of villages in India
