= Chainewal =

- Village
- Location within Punjab
- Coordinates: 29.760°N 75.381°E
- Country: India
- State: Punjab
- District: Gurdaspur
- Tehsil: Dera Baba Nanak
- Region: Majha

Government
  - Type: Panchayat raj
  - Body: Gram panchayat

Area
  - Total: 135 ha (330 acres)

Population (2011)
  - Total: 1,018; 535/483 ♂/♀
  - Scheduled Castes: 186; 96/90 ♂/♀
  - Total Households: 192

Languages
  - Official: Punjabi
- Time zone: UTC+5:30 (IST)
- Telephone: 01871
- ISO 3166 code: IN-PB
- Website: gurdaspur.nic.in

Chainewal is a village in Dera Baba Nanak in Gurdaspur district of Punjab State, India. It is located 28 kilometres (17 mi) from sub district headquarter and 40 kilometres (25 mi) from district headquarter. The village is administrated by Sarpanch an elected representative of the village.

== Demography ==
As of 2011, the village has a total number of 192 houses and a population of 1018 of which 535 are males while 483 are females. According to the report published by Census India in 2011, out of the total population of the village 186 people are from Schedule Caste and the village does not have any Schedule Tribe population so far.

== See also ==
- List of villages in India
