= Dehar =

- Village
- Country: India
- State: Punjab
- District: Gurdaspur
- Tehsil: Dera Baba Nanak
- Region: Majha

Government
  - Type: Panchayat raj
  - Body: Gram panchayat

Area
  - Total: 372 ha (920 acres)

Population (2011)
  - Total: 1,732; 911/821 ♂/♀
  - Scheduled Castes: 75; 34/41 ♂/♀
  - Total Households: 336

Languages
  - Official: Punjabi
- Time zone: UTC+5:30 (IST)
- Telephone: 01871
- ISO 3166 code: IN-PB
- Website: gurdaspur.nic.in

Dehar is a village in Dera Baba Nanak in Gurdaspur district of Punjab State, India. It is located 9 kilometres (5.6 mi) from sub district headquarter and 34 kilometres (21 mi) from district headquarter. The village is administrated by Sarpanch an elected representative of the village.

== Demography ==
As of 2011, the village has a total number of 336 houses and a population of 1732 of which 911 are males while 821 are females. According to the report published by Census India in 2011, out of the total population of the village 75 people are from Schedule Caste and the village does not have any Schedule Tribe population so far.

== See also ==
- List of villages in India
