= Kotli Dayaram =

- Village
- Country: India
- State: Punjab
- District: Gurdaspur
- Tehsil: Dera Baba Nanak
- Region: Majha

Government
  - Type: Panchayat raj
  - Body: Gram panchayat

Area
  - Total: 14 ha (35 acres)

Population (2011)
  - Total: 0

Languages
  - Official: Punjabi
- Time zone: UTC+5:30 (IST)
- Telephone: 01871
- ISO 3166 code: IN-PB
- Website: gurdaspur.nic.in

Kotli Dayaram is a village in Dera Baba Nanak in Gurdaspur district of Punjab State, India. It is located from sub district headquarter and from district headquarter. The village is administrated by Sarpanch an elected representative of the village.

== Demography ==
According to the report published by Census India in 2011, the village does not have any population so far.

== See also ==
- List of villages in India
