= Arli Bhan =

Coordinates: 31°58′N 75°08′E

- Village
- Interactive map of Arli Bhan
- Country: India
- State: Punjab
- District: Gurdaspur
- Tehsil: Dera Baba Nanak
- Region: Majha

Government
  - Type: Panchayat raj
  - Body: Gram panchayat

Area
  - Total: 272 ha (670 acres)

Population (2011)
  - Total: 1,723; 907/816 ♂/♀
  - Scheduled Castes: 201; 105/96 ♂/♀
  - Total Households: 302

Languages
  - Official: Punjabi
- Time zone: UTC+5:30 (IST)
- Telephone: 01871
- ISO 3166 code: IN-PB
- Website: gurdaspur.nic.in

Arli Bhan is a village in Dera Baba Nanak in Gurdaspur district of Punjab State, India. It is located 22 kilometres (14 mi) from sub district headquarter and 50 kilometres (31 mi) from district headquarter. The village is administrated by Sarpanch, an elected representative of the village.

== Demography ==
As of 2011, the village has a total number of 302 houses and a population of 1723 of which 907 are males while 816 are females. According to the report published by Census India in 2011, out of the total population of the village 201 people are from Schedule Caste and the village does not have any Schedule Tribe population so far.

== See also ==
- List of villages in India
