= Talwandi Hinduan =

- Village
- Country: India
- State: Punjab
- District: Gurdaspur
- Tehsil: Dera Baba Nanak
- Region: Majha

Government
  - Type: Panchayat raj
  - Body: Gram panchayat

Area
  - Total: 117 ha (290 acres)

Population (2011)
  - Total: 791; 433/358 ♂/♀
  - Scheduled Castes: 0; 0/0 ♂/♀
  - Total Households: 142

Languages
  - Official: Punjabi
- Time zone: UTC+5:30 (IST)
- Telephone: 01871
- ISO 3166 code: IN-PB
- Website: gurdaspur.nic.in

Talwandi Hinduan is a village in Dera Baba Nanak in Gurdaspur district of Punjab State, India. It is located 10 kilometres (6.2 mi) from sub district headquarter and 50 kilometres (31 mi) from district headquarter. The village is administrated by Sarpanch an elected representative of the village.

== Demography ==
As of 2011, the village has a total number of 142 houses and a population of 791 of which 433 are males while 358 are females. According to the report published by Census India in 2011, out of the total population of the village 0 people are from Schedule Caste and the village does not have any Schedule Tribe population so far.

== See also ==
- List of villages in India
