= Loharanwali =

Coordinates: 31°55′N 74°57′E

- Village
- Interactive map of Loharanwali
- Country: India
- State: Punjab
- District: Gurdaspur
- Tehsil: Dera Baba Nanak
- Region: Majha

Government
  - Type: Panchayat raj
  - Body: Gram panchayat

Area
  - Total: 137 ha (340 acres)

Population (2011)
  - Total: 358; 189/169 ♂/♀
  - Scheduled Castes: 41; 21/20 ♂/♀
  - Total Households: 69

Languages
  - Official: Punjabi
- Time zone: UTC+5:30 (IST)
- Telephone: 01871
- ISO 3166 code: IN-PB
- Website: gurdaspur.nic.in

Loharanwali is a village in Dera Baba Nanak in Gurdaspur district of Punjab State, India. It is located 12 kilometres (7.5 mi) from sub district headquarter and 52 kilometres (32 mi) from district headquarter. The village is administrated by Sarpanch an elected representative of the village.

== Demography ==
As of 2011, the village has a total number of 69 houses and a population of 358 of which 189 are males while 169 are females. According to the report published by Census India in 2011, out of the total population of the village 41 people are from Schedule Caste and the village does not have any Schedule Tribe population so far.

== See also ==
- List of villages in India
