= Hardowal =

- Village
- Country: India
- State: Punjab
- District: Gurdaspur
- Tehsil: Dera Baba Nanak
- Region: Majha

Government
  - Type: Panchayat raj
  - Body: Gram panchayat

Area
  - Total: 1,560 ha (3,900 acres)

Population (2011)
  - Total: 4,742; 2,494/2,248 ♂/♀
  - Scheduled Castes: 779; 404/375 ♂/♀
  - Total Households: 824

Languages
  - Official: Punjabi
- Time zone: UTC+5:30 (IST)
- Telephone: 01871
- ISO 3166 code: IN-PB
- Website: gurdaspur.nic.in

Hardowal is a village in Dera Baba Nanak in Gurdaspur district of Punjab State, India. It is located 5 kilometres (3.1 mi) from sub district headquarter and 60 kilometres (37 mi) from district headquarter. The village is administrated by Sarpanch an elected representative of the village.

== Demography ==
As of 2011, the village has a total number of 824 houses and a population of 4742 of which 2494 are males while 2248 are females. According to the report published by Census India in 2011, out of the total population of the village 779 people are from Schedule Caste and the village does not have any Schedule Tribe population so far.

== See also ==
- List of villages in India
