= Imam Ali Shah (sufi saint) =

Muslim Saint (1798–1865)

Sayyid Imam Ali Shah
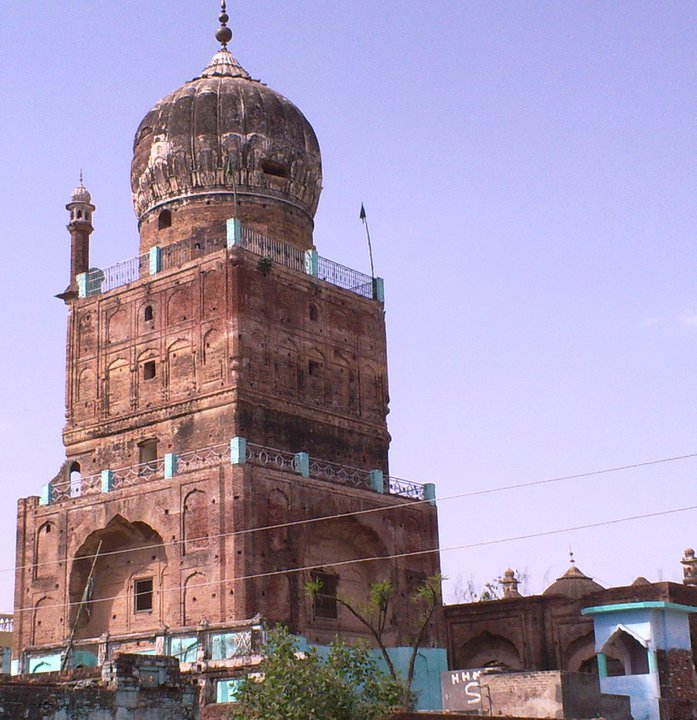
- The mausoleum of Ali Shah in Punjab, present-day India

Personal life
- Born: 1798 Rattar Chhattar
- Died: 1865 (aged 66–67) Rattar Chhattar

Religious life
- Religion: Islam
- Denomination: Sunni
- Tariqa: Qadiriyya wa Naqshbandiyya

Muslim leader
- Influenced by: Abdul Qadir Gilani, Bahauddin Naqshband

Sayyid Imam Ali Shah (1798-1865) was an Indian Sufi Saint. He was an adherent of the Qadiriyya wa Naqshbandiyya Sufi order. He is from Rattar Chhattar a village in Punjab that is called "the noble sanctuary" (Makkan Sharif) in his honor.

== Early life ==
Ali Shah was born in Rattan Chattar to the Sufi Saint Sayyid Hussain Shah. Sayyid Hussain Shah was known as a revered ascetic and died when Ali Shah was young. He then lived with his maternal grandparents together with his mother and brother. Ali Shah was educated about Islamic Law (Sharia) and Medicine and attended lectures on speculative theology (Kalam) and Sufi metaphysics at the shrine of Fariduddin Ganjshakar together with his teacher Mawlana Jan Muhammad Chishti and his uncle. After graduating as a certified scholar, Ali Shah served as his uncle's representative.

== Career ==
When his uncle died two years after his graduation, Ali Shah participated in missionary activities. He founded a center called "adobe of holiness" (Dar al-Aqdas) where he centered his missionary activities. He was known for integrating philanthropic solutions like nutrition supply as well as establishing a center of Naqshbandi education in which 300 disciples could be instructed. Sources say that 300 goats had to be slaughtered in order to meet the daily demands of visitors and disciples, which reached one hundred thousand followers. His followers were mostly from South and Central Asia.

British Indian investigators mention Ali Shah's popularity and that disciples were "flocking in bands" in order to pay tribute to him. He was described in their reports as a welcoming personality.

== Teachings ==
Ali Shah is said to have emphasized the central importance of noble behavior (Adab) in Islam.

== Legacy ==
Imam Ali Shah is venerated by the people of Rattan Chattar as their village's patron saint. Village inhabitants refer to Imam Ali Shah's blessings on the occasion of the lack of casualties during the Indo-Pakistani border skirmirshes in the 70s. His descendants include Mir Mazhar al-Qayyum Shah as well as Sayyid Mahfooz Hussein Shah. They furthered Imam Ali Shah's legacy.

His tomb is situated near the Ravi river in the Batala and is considered by Gazetters as an "eye-filling" cultural heritage sight.
