= Jivan =

Jivan is a given name and a surname. It is often a Romanian spelling for the South Slavic name “Živan/Живан”. Notable people with the name include:

- Jivan Avetisyan, Armenian film director
- Alin Jivan, Romanian artist gymnast
- Kantilal Jivan, Seychellois artist
- Bhanwarlal Jivan, Indian politician
- Jag Jivan Ram, Indian politician
- Jivan Gasparyan, Armenian musician and composer

== See also ==
- Jivani
- Jiwan
- Živan
