= Khawaja Wardag =

Khawaja Wardag Dera pathana
- Village
- Khawaja Wardag (Dera Pathana)
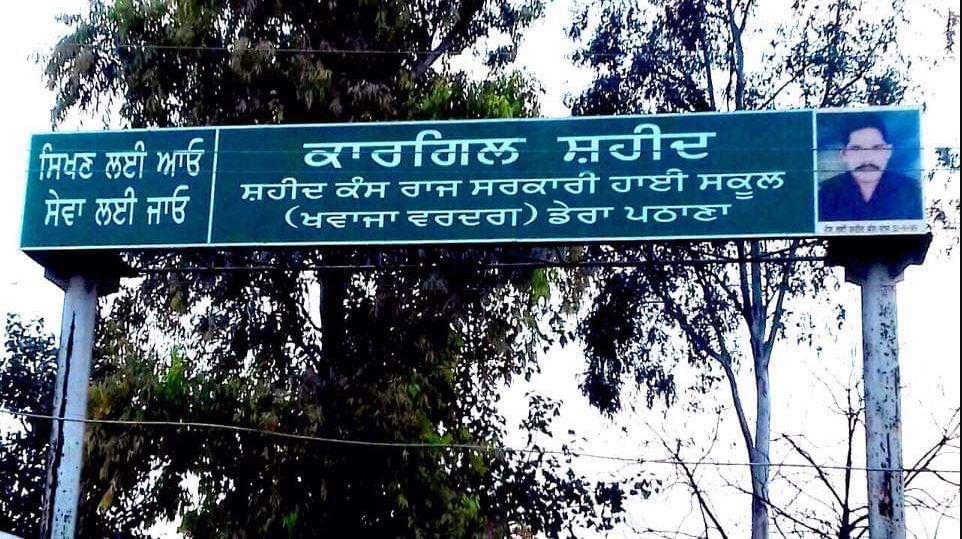
- Country: India
- State: Punjab
- District: Gurdaspur
- Tehsil: Dera Baba Nanak
- Region: Majha

Government
  - Type: Panchayat raj
  - Body: Gram panchayat

Area
  - Total: 312 ha (770 acres)

Population (2011)
  - Total: 1,348; 734/614 ♂/♀
  - Scheduled Castes: 24; 17/7 ♂/♀
  - Total Households: 242

Languages
  - Official: Punjabi
- Time zone: UTC+5:30 (IST)
- Postal code: 143605
- Telephone: 01871
- ISO 3166 code: IN-PB
- Website: m.facebook.com/officialDerapathana/

Khawaja Wardag (Dera Pathana) is a village in Dera Baba Nanak in Gurdaspur district of Punjab State.

Khawaja Wardag is basically an Afghan Muslim village before partition. One of the member from Afghan tribe (Wardag Ismail Khan Kaka with his two sons left village "Shahniz" Ghazni Afghanistan in 1590 and settled in Kakedhir of India and this village given a new name Khawaja Wardag as small village on Batala dera baba nanak Road. Then Ismail Khan Kaka's two sons Sulaman Shah and Feroz Shah settled in other small towns and purchased a fortress or qilla and the given name was Qilla Afghan and the village subsequently became known as Kala Afghana. The history of village Khwaja Wardag and village Kala Afghana is directly interlinked with each other.

== Demography ==
As of 2011, the village has a total number of 242 houses and a population of 1348 of which 734 are males while 614 are females. According to the report published by Census India in 2011, out of the total population of the village 24 people are from Schedule Caste and the village does not have any Schedule Tribe population so far.

== Sarpanch Ram singh welcomes kabaddi player gurmukh singh he returned from Canada in 2011 ==
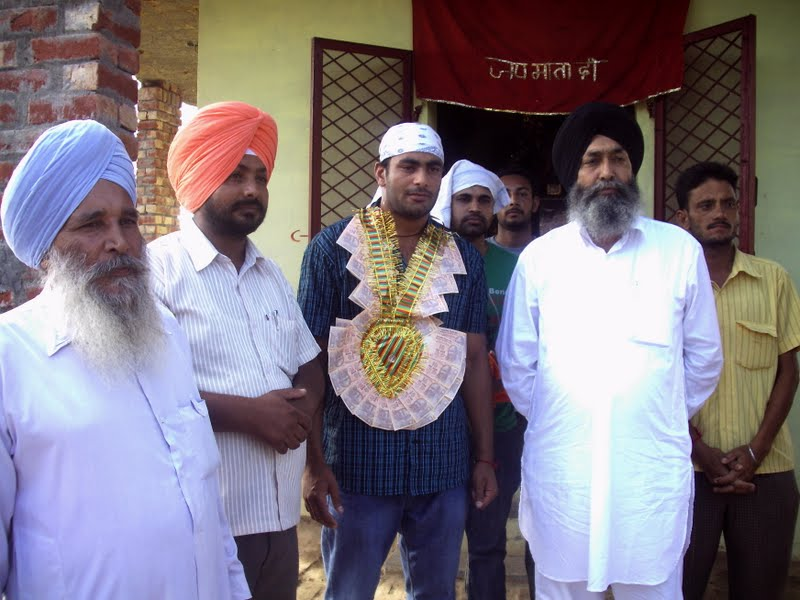
Sarpanch Ram singh welcome kabaddi player gurmukh singh in 2011

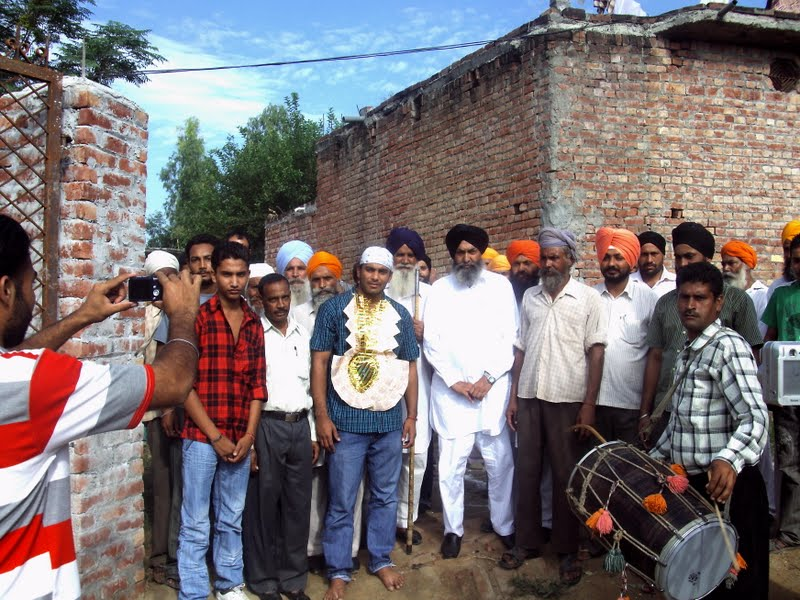
Panchyat khawaja wardag 2011

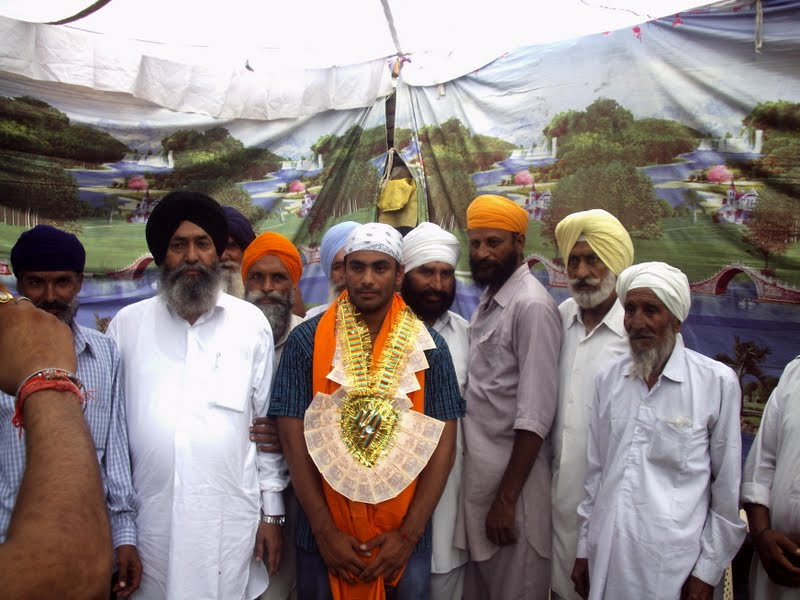
Ram singh sarpanch award to kabaddi player gurmukh singh in 2011

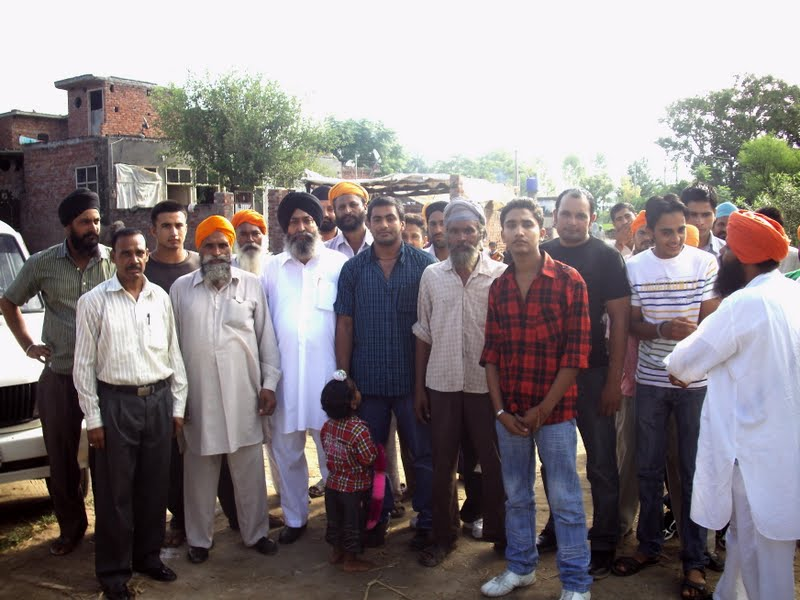
village photo 2011

== Youngsters cleaned the village and planted palm trees in 2019 ==
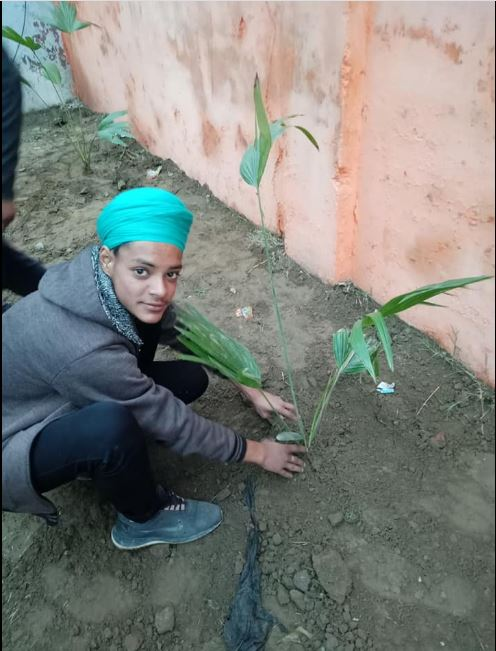
Simranjit Singh

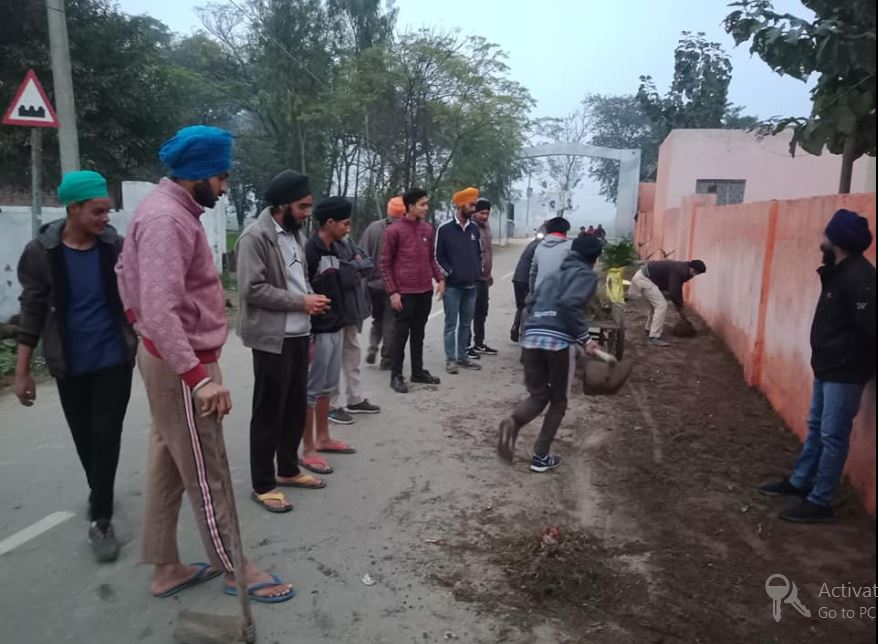
Ravinder singh Deol with his friends

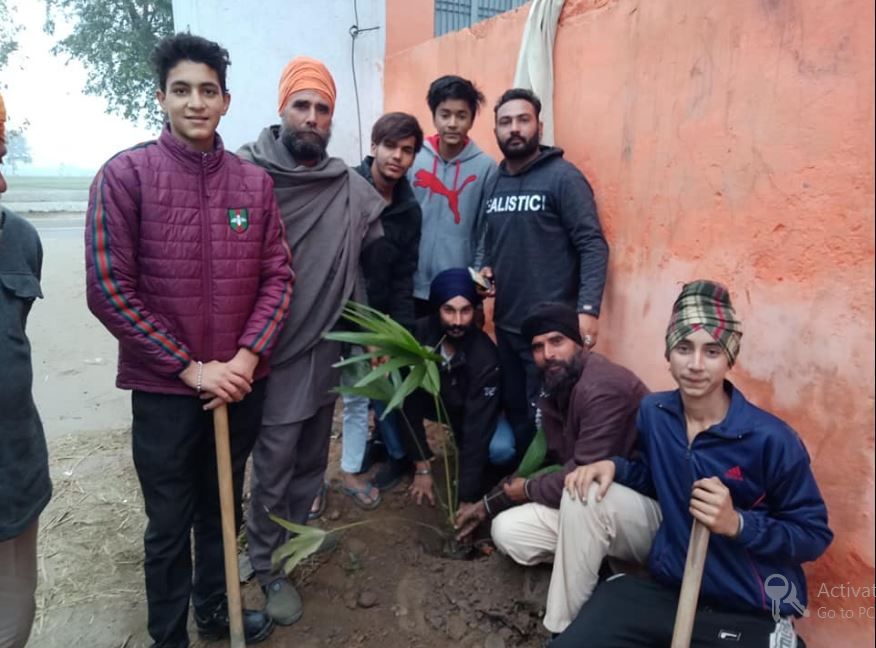
Nitin kumar sharma with friends

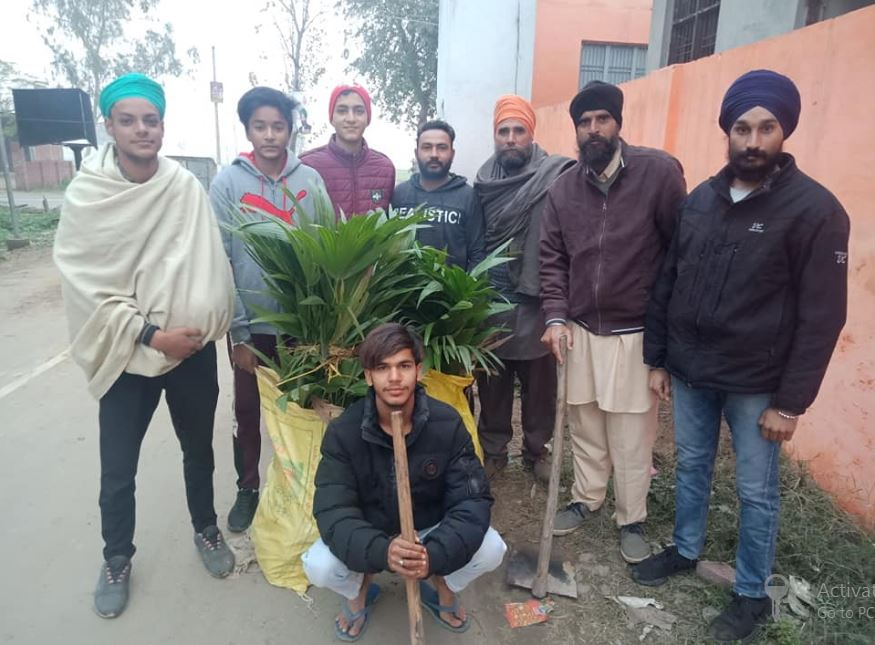
Simranjit singh with friends

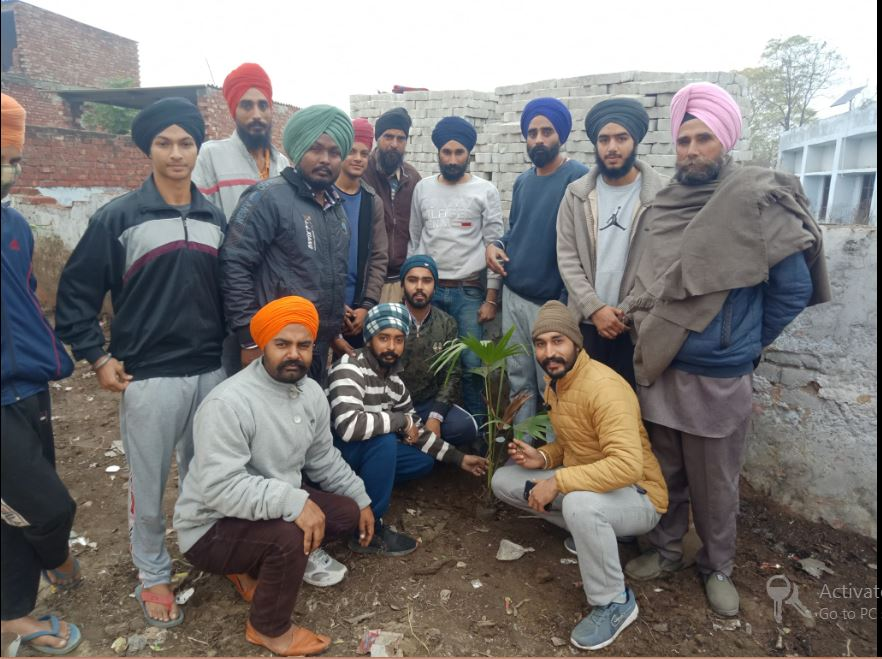
Lakhwinder singh, Amarjit singh with friends
