= Radio Light =

Fiji
- Frequencies: 104.2 MHz in Suva, Navua and Nausori

Programming
- Format: Christian

Ownership
- Owner: Evangelical Bible Mission Trust Board

History
- First air date: November 26, 1996

Links
- Webcast: https://radiolight.radio12345.com
- Website: www.radiolight.org

Radio Light is a listener supported, English language Christian, radio station in Fiji. The station broadcasts on the 104.2Mhz to the cities of Suva, Navua and Nausori. The station also broadcasts on line.

It is operated by Evangelical Bible Mission Trust Board the organisation which also operates Radio Naya Jiwan and Na iTalai FM in Fiji. Radio Light was launched on November 26, 1996, with the mission to carry the message of The Christ in Fiji.
