= Gunia =

- Village
- Country: India
- State: Punjab
- District: Gurdaspur
- Tehsil: Dera Baba Nanak
- Region: Majha

Government
  - Type: Panchayat raj
  - Body: Gram panchayat

Area
  - Total: 174 ha (430 acres)

Population (2011)
  - Total: 0 / ♂/♀
  - Scheduled Castes: / ♂/♀

Languages
  - Official: Punjabi
- Time zone: UTC+5:30 (IST)
- Telephone: 01871
- ISO 3166 code: IN-PB
- Website: gurdaspur.nic.in

Gunia is a village in Dera Baba Nanak in Gurdaspur district of Punjab State, India. It is located from sub district headquarter and from district headquarter. The village is administrated by Sarpanch an elected representative of the village.

== Demography ==
As of 2011, the village has a total number of houses and a population of 0 of which are males while are females. According to the report published by Census India in 2011, out of the total population of the village people are from Schedule Caste and the village does not have any Schedule Tribe population so far.

== See also ==
- List of villages in India
