= Pakhoke Mehmaran =

- Village
- Country: India
- State: Punjab
- District: Gurdaspur
- Tehsil: Dera Baba Nanak
- Region: Majha

Government
  - Type: Panchayat raj
  - Body: Gram panchayat

Area
  - Total: 85 ha (210 acres)

Population (2011)
  - Total: 676; 349/327 ♂/♀
  - Scheduled Castes: 172; 89/83 ♂/♀
  - Total Households: 118

Languages
  - Official: Punjabi
- Time zone: UTC+5:30 (IST)
- Telephone: 01871
- ISO 3166 code: IN-PB
- Website: gurdaspur.nic.in

Pakhoke Mehmaran is a village in Dera Baba Nanak in Gurdaspur district of Punjab State, India. It is located 42 kilometres (26 mi) from Gurdaspur, district headquarter and 2 kilometres (1.2 mi) from Dera Baba Nanak, sub district headquarter. The village is administrated by Sarpanch an elected representative of the village. Famous Sikh Sewak (Social Worker) Balwinder Singh Pakhoke Belong To This Village.

== Demography ==
As of 2011, the village has a total number of 118 houses and a population of 676 of which 349 are males while 327 are females. According to the report published by Census India in 2011, out of the total population of the village 172 people are from Schedule Caste and the village does not have any Schedule Tribe population so far.

The majority of people related to Randhawa Jatt in the village

Sardar Suchet Singh Randhawa belongs to the Jagirdars of Sikh Raj. His ancestor's had a Killa in this village ( now there is Gurdwara Sahib). His ancestors fought many battles under Sikh Raj. After the end of Sikh Raj, East India Government cancelled the whole Jagir which was granted by Maharaja Ranjit Singh. His son was Sardar Thakar Singh Randhawa. He fought the legally for take revert the cancelled land.

Sardar Thakar Singh Randhawa had three sons; Sardar Surat Singh Randhawa, Sardar Darshan Singh Randhawa and Sardar Tara Singh Randhawa. Next only Sardar Darshan Singh Randhawa are four sons; Sardar Harjit Singh Randhawa, Sardar Harbans Singh Randhawa, Sardar Harjit Singh Randhawa and Sardar Baldev Singh Randhawa.

Now Sardar Harjit Singh Randhawa is living in the village.

Sardar Harbans Singh Randhawa shifted to Bela Tajowal, Tehsil Balachaur, District SBS Nagar, Punjab. Sardar Harbans Singh Randhawa have five sons. His son Sardar Jagdish Singh Randhawa was the Sarpanch of Bela Tajowal and now Sardar Jagdish Singh Randhawa's wife Sardarni Manjit Kaur Randhawa is coming Sarpanch of the village.

== See also ==
- List of villages in India
