= Udhowali Kalan =

Coordinates: 31°57′N 75°02′E

- Village
- Interactive map of Udhowali Kalan
- Country: India
- State: Punjab
- District: Gurdaspur
- Tehsil: Dera Baba Nanak
- Region: Majha

Government
  - Type: Panchayat raj
  - Body: Gram panchayat

Area
  - Total: 199 ha (490 acres)

Population (2011)
  - Total: 1,235; 627/608 ♂/♀
  - Scheduled Castes: 387; 203/184 ♂/♀
  - Total Households: 219

Languages
  - Official: Punjabi
- Time zone: UTC+5:30 (IST)
- Telephone: 01871
- ISO 3166 code: IN-PB
- Website: gurdaspur.nic.in

Udhowali Kalan is a village in Dera Baba Nanak in Gurdaspur district of Punjab State, India. It is located 20 kilometres (12 mi) from sub district headquarter and 40 kilometres (25 mi) from district headquarter. The village is administrated by Sarpanch an elected representative of the village.

== Demography ==
As of 2011, the village has a total number of 219 houses and a population of 1235 of which 627 are males while 608 are females. According to the report published by Census India in 2011, out of the total population of the village 387 people are from Schedule Caste and the village does not have any Schedule Tribe population so far.

== See also ==
- List of villages in India
