= Ali Nangal =

- Village
- Interactive map of Ali Nangal
- Coordinates: 31°57′56.62″N 75°03′51.52″E
- Country: India
- State: Punjab
- District: Gurdaspur
- Tehsil: Dera Baba Nanak
- Region: Majha

Government
  - Type: Panchayat raj
  - Body: Gram panchayat

Area
  - Total: 168 ha (420 acres)

Population (2011)
  - Total: 554; 295/259 ♂/♀
  - Scheduled Castes: 0; 0/0 ♂/♀
  - Total Households: 114

Languages
  - Official: Punjabi
- Time zone: UTC+5:30 (IST)
- Telephone: 01871
- ISO 3166 code: IN-PB
- Website: gurdaspur.nic.in

Ali Nangal is a village in Dera Baba Nanak in Gurdaspur district of Punjab State, India. It is located 12 kilometres (7.5 mi) from sub district headquarter and 40 kilometres (25 mi) from district headquarter. The village is administrated by Sarpanch an elected representative of the village.

== Demography ==
As of the 2011 Census of India, the village has a total number of 114 houses and a population of 554 of which 295 are males while 259 are females. According to the report published by Census India in 2011, out of the total population of the village 0 people are from Schedule Caste and the village does not have any Schedule Tribe population so far.

== See also ==
- List of villages in India
