= Tarowali =

Coordinates: 31°58′N 75°02′E

- Village
- Interactive map of Tarowali
- Country: India
- State: Punjab
- District: Gurdaspur
- Tehsil: Dera Baba Nanak
- Region: Majha

Government
  - Type: Panchayat raj
  - Body: Gram panchayat

Area
  - Total: 128 ha (320 acres)

Population (2011)
  - Total: 240; 129/111 ♂/♀
  - Scheduled Castes: 169; 88/81 ♂/♀
  - Total Households: 44

Languages
  - Official: Punjabi
- Time zone: UTC+5:30 (IST)
- Telephone: 01871
- ISO 3166 code: IN-PB
- Website: gurdaspur.nic.in

Tarowali is a village in Dera Baba Nanak in Gurdaspur district of Punjab State, India. It is located 11 kilometres (6.8 mi) from sub district headquarter and 58 kilometres (36 mi) from district headquarter. The village is administrated by Sarpanch an elected representative of the village.

== Demography ==
As of 2011, the village has a total number of 44 houses and a population of 240 of which 129 are males while 111 are females. According to the report published by Census India in 2011, out of the total population of the village 169 people are from Schedule Caste and the village does not have any Schedule Tribe population so far.

== See also ==
- List of villages in India
