= Alawalwala =

Village in Punjab, India

Coordinates: 31°55′N 75°00′E

- Village
- Interactive map of Alawalwala
- Country: India
- State: Punjab
- District: Gurdaspur
- Tehsil: Dera Baba Nanak
- Region: Majha

Government
  - Type: Panchayat raj
  - Body: Gram panchayat

Area
  - Total: 113 ha (280 acres)

Population (2011)
  - Total: 427; 231/196 ♂/♀
  - Scheduled Castes: 18; 9/9 ♂/♀
  - Total Households: 83

Languages
  - Official: Punjabi
- Time zone: UTC+5:30 (IST)
- Telephone: 01871
- ISO 3166 code: IN-PB
- Website: gurdaspur.nic.in

Alawalwala is a village in Dera Baba Nanak in Gurdaspur district of Punjab State, India. It is located 13 kilometres (8.1 mi) from sub district headquarter and 53 kilometres (33 mi) from district headquarter. The village is administrated by Sarpanch an elected representative of the village.

== Demography ==
As of the 2011 Census of India, the village has a total number of 83 houses and the population of 427 of which 231 are males while 196 are females. According to the report published by Census India in 2011, out of the total population of the village 18 people are from Schedule Caste and the village does not have any Schedule Tribe population so far.

== See also ==
- List of villages in India
