= Jaurian Kalan =

- Village
- Country: India
- State: Punjab
- District: Gurdaspur
- Tehsil: Dera Baba Nanak
- Region: Majha

Government
  - Type: Panchayat raj
  - Body: Gram panchayat

Area
  - Total: 311 ha (770 acres)

Population (2011)
  - Total: 1,744; 1,144/600 ♂/♀
  - Scheduled Castes: 26; 10/16 ♂/♀
  - Total Households: 278

Languages
  - Official: Punjabi
- Time zone: UTC+5:30 (IST)
- Telephone: 01871
- ISO 3166 code: IN-PB
- Website: gurdaspur.nic.in

Jaurian Kalan is a village in Dera Baba Nanak in Gurdaspur district of Punjab State, India. It is located 2 kilometres (1.2 mi) from sub district headquarter and 40 kilometres (25 mi) from district headquarter. The village is administrated by Sarpanch an elected representative of the village.

== Demography ==
As of 2011, the village has a total number of 278 houses and a population of 1744 of which 1144 are males while 600 are females. According to the report published by Census India in 2011, out of the total population of the village 26 people are from Schedule Caste and the village does not have any Schedule Tribe population so far.

== See also ==
- List of villages in India
