= Tarpala =

- Village
- Country: India
- State: Punjab
- District: Gurdaspur
- Tehsil: Dera Baba Nanak
- Region: Majha

Government
  - Type: Panchayat raj
  - Body: Gram panchayat

Area
  - Total: 258 ha (640 acres)

Population (2011)
  - Total: 770; 418/352 ♂/♀
  - Scheduled Castes: 147; 81/66 ♂/♀
  - Total Households: 142

Languages
  - Official: Punjabi
- Time zone: UTC+5:30 (IST)
- Telephone: 01871
- ISO 3166 code: IN-PB
- Website: gurdaspur.nic.in

Tarpala is a village in Dera Baba Nanak in Gurdaspur district of the Indiant state of Punjab.

== Geography ==
It is located 14 kilometres (8.7 mi) from sub district headquarter and 54 kilometres (34 mi) from district headquarters. The village is administrated by a Sarpanch, an elected representative of the village.

== Education ==
A school educates children.

== Administration ==
The sarpanch of this village is Gurmej Singh. The village has three gurudwaras and one Hindu temple.

== Demographics ==
As of 2011, the village has 142 houses and a population of 770 including 418 males and 352 females. 147 people are from Schedule Castes but no Scheduled Tribes.

== See also ==
- List of villages in India
