= Pabbarali =

- Village
- Country: India
- State: Punjab
- District: Gurdaspur
- Tehsil: Dera Baba Nanak
- Region: Majha

Government
  - Type: Panchayat raj
  - Body: Gram panchayat

Area
  - Total: 642 ha (1,590 acres)

Population (2011)
  - Total: 2,206; 1,145/1,061 ♂/♀
  - Scheduled Castes: 26; 15/11 ♂/♀
  - Total Households: 425

Languages
  - Official: Punjabi
- Time zone: UTC+5:30 (IST)
- Telephone: 01871
- ISO 3166 code: IN-PB
- Website: gurdaspur.nic.in

Pabbarali is a village in Dera Baba Nanak in Gurdaspur district of Punjab State, India. It is located 18 kilometres (11 mi) from sub district headquarter and 58 kilometres (36 mi) from district headquarter. The village is administrated by Sarpanch an elected representative of the village.

== Demography ==
As of 2011, the village has a total number of 425 houses and a population of 2206 of which 1145 are males while 1061 are females. According to the report published by Census India in 2011, out of the total population of the village 26 people are from Schedule Caste and the village does not have any Schedule Tribe population so far.

== See also ==
- List of villages in India
