= Dhesian =

- Village
- Country: India
- State: Punjab
- District: Gurdaspur
- Tehsil: Dera Baba Nanak
- Region: Majha

Government
  - Type: Panchayat raj
  - Body: Gram panchayat

Area
  - Total: 144 ha (360 acres)

Population (2011)
  - Total: 848; 441/407 ♂/♀
  - Scheduled Castes: 0; 0/0 ♂/♀
  - Total Households: 163

Languages
  - Official: Punjabi
- Time zone: UTC+5:30 (IST)
- Telephone: 01871
- ISO 3166 code: IN-PB
- Website: gurdaspur.nic.in

Dhesian is a village in Dera Baba Nanak in Gurdaspur district of Punjab State, India. It is located 16 kilometres (9.9 mi) from sub district headquarter and 50 kilometres (31 mi) from district headquarter. The village is administrated by Sarpanch an elected representative of the village.

== Demography ==
As of 2011, the village has a total number of 163 houses and a population of 848 of which 441 are males while 407 are females. According to the report published by Census India in 2011, out of the total population of the village 0 people are from Schedule Caste and the village does not have any Schedule Tribe population so far.

== See also ==
- List of villages in India
