= Pokhoke Dera Baba Nanak =

- Village
- Country: India
- State: Punjab
- District: Gurdaspur
- Tehsil: Dera Baba Nanak
- Region: Majha

Government
  - Type: Panchayat raj
  - Body: Gram panchayat

Area
  - Total: 395 ha (980 acres)

Population (2011)
  - Total: 1,302; 690/612 ♂/♀
  - Scheduled Castes: 21; 13/8 ♂/♀
  - Total Households: 253

Languages
  - Official: Punjabi
- Time zone: UTC+5:30 (IST)
- Telephone: 01871
- ISO 3166 code: IN-PB
- Website: gurdaspur.nic.in

Pokhoke Dera Baba Nanak is a village in Dera Baba Nanak in Gurdaspur district of Punjab State, India. It is located 0.5 kilometres (0.31 mi) from sub district headquarter and 40 kilometres (25 mi) from district headquarter. The village is administrated by Sarpanch an elected representative of the village.

== Demography ==
As of 2011, the village has a total number of 253 houses and a population of 1302 of which 690 are males while 612 are females. According to the report published by Census India in 2011, out of the total population of the village 21 people are from Schedule Caste and the village does not have any Schedule Tribe population so far.

== See also ==
- List of villages in India
