= Udhowali Khurd =

Coordinates: 31°57′N 75°02′E

- Village
- Interactive map of Udhowali Khurd
- Country: India
- State: Punjab
- District: Gurdaspur
- Tehsil: Dera Baba Nanak
- Region: Majha

Government
  - Type: Panchayat raj
  - Body: Gram panchayat

Area
  - Total: 231 ha (570 acres)

Population (2011)
  - Total: 1,411; 751/660 ♂/♀
  - Scheduled Castes: 63; 32/31 ♂/♀
  - Total Households: 266

Languages
  - Official: Punjabi
- Time zone: UTC+5:30 (IST)
- Telephone: 01871
- ISO 3166 code: IN-PB
- Website: gurdaspur.nic.in

Udhowali Khurd is a village in Dera Baba Nanak in Gurdaspur district of Punjab State, India. It is located 19 kilometres (12 mi) from sub district headquarter and 40 kilometres (25 mi) from district headquarter. The village is administrated by Sarpanch an elected representative of the village.

== Demography ==
As of 2011, the village has a total number of 266 houses and a population of 1411 of which 751 are males while 660 are females. According to the report published by Census India in 2011, out of the total population of the village 63 people are from Schedule Caste and the village does not have any Schedule Tribe population so far.

== See also ==
- List of villages in India
