= Listen2myradio =

Internet streaming radio service

listen2myradio
- Website type: Radio streaming, video streaming, website hosting
- Available in: English, Spanish, Portuguese, Greek, Italian, French, German
- Owner: MediaHosting LTD
- Website: www.listen2myradio.com
- Commercial: Yes
- Registration: Optional (required for broadcasting)
- Launched: 2006
- Current status: Active

Listen2myradio is an Internet radio, video streaming and website hosting service founded by WebCode LTD (now MediaHosting LTD) in 2006. As of 2012, the service had over one million sign-ups, according to listen2myradio's website.

The most common use of listen2myradio is for creating or listening to Internet radio stations; however, video streams exist as well. The majority of listen2myradio broadcasters are hobbyists and amateur DJs, but some traditional radio stations also use the service to extend their presence onto the Web. Listen2MyRadio supports SHOUTcast and IceCast protocol for radio streaming and H.264 and VP6 codecs for streaming video.

For broadcasting users can register either for free accounts supported by visual ads or for paid subscriptions without ads and with a range of extra features such as unlimited bandwidth and AutoDJ. For website hosting, only paid subscriptions currently available.

Listen2myradio was named among the best websites of 2006 by the Israeli largest online newspaper Ynet.
