= Jiwan Nangal =

- Village
- Country: India
- State: Punjab
- District: Gurdaspur
- Tehsil: Dera Baba Nanak
- Region: Majha

Government
  - Type: Panchayat raj
  - Body: Gram panchayat

Area
  - Total: 153 ha (380 acres)

Population (2011)
  - Total: 643; 341/302 ♂/♀
  - Scheduled Castes: 50; 24/26 ♂/♀
  - Total Households: 136

Languages
  - Official: Punjabi
- Time zone: UTC+5:30 (IST)
- Telephone: 01871
- ISO 3166 code: IN-PB
- Website: gurdaspur.nic.in

Jiwan Nangal is a village in Dera Baba Nanak in Gurdaspur district of Punjab State, India. It is located 29 kilometres (18 mi) from sub district headquarter and 40 kilometres (25 mi) from district headquarter. The village is administrated by the Sarpanch an elected representative of the village.

== Demography ==
As of 2011, the village has a total number of 136 houses and a population of 643 of which 341 are males while 302 are females. According to the report published by Census India in 2011, out of the total population of the village 50 people are from Schedule Caste and the village does not have any Schedule Tribe population so far.

== See also ==
- List of villages in India
