= Dera Baba Nanak =

- Town
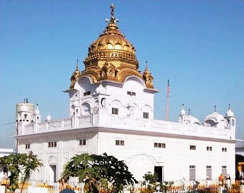
- Sri Dera Baba Nanak Sahib Gurudwara, Gurdaspur district, Punjab
- Nickname: DBN
- Location within Punjab Location within India
- Coordinates: 32.032°N 75.029°E
- Country: India
- State: Punjab
- District: Gurdaspur
- Nearest city: Gurdaspur city
- Founder: Guru Nanak

Government
  - Type: Municipal Council
- Elevation: 242 m (794 ft)

Population (2021)
  - Total: ~10,000

Languages
  - Official: Punjabi
- Time zone: UTC+5:30 (IST)
- Postal code: 143604
- Vehicle registration: PB-58

Dera Baba Nanak is a town and a municipal council in Gurdaspur district, in the state of Punjab, India. It is the sub-district headquarters of Dera Baba Nanak tehsil. It is 36 km away from Gurdaspur city, the capital of the district. In November 2019, a corridor between India and Pakistan was established at its shrine.

== Demographics ==
As of 2011 India census, Dera Baba Nanak city had a population of 6,394. Of which the number of males were 3,331 and the number of females were 3,063. Dera Baba Nanak has an average literacy rate of 87.42%, higher than the state average of 75.84%: male literacy is 90.36%, and female literacy is 84.27%. In Dera Baba Nanak 9.34% of the population is under 6 years of age.

In 2011, the sex ratio of Dera Baba Nanak city was 920, compared to the state average of 895. The child sex ratio was around 843, compared to the state average of 846. The scheduled caste population comprises the 25.95% of the total population of the municipal council.

The table below shows the percentage of different religious groups in Dera Baba Nanak city, according to the 2011 census.

Percentage of religious groups in Dera Baba Nanak city - 2011 census
Religion	Percentage (2011)
Hindu	55.51%
Sikh	41.09%
Christian	2.89%
Muslim	0.27%
Buddhist	0.03%
Others	0.02%
No religion	0.20%

The table below shows the population of different religious groups in Dera Baba Nanak city and their gender ratio, as of 2011 census.

Population by religious groups in Dera Baba Nanak city, 2011 census
Religion	Total	Female	Male	Gender ratio
Hindu	3,549	1,695	1,854	914
Sikh	2,627	1,264	1,363	927
Christian	185	85	100	850
Muslim	17	10	7	1428
Buddhist	2	2	0	--
Other religions	3	2	1	2000
Not stated	41	21	20	1050
Total	6,394	3,063	3,331	919

== History ==
Dera Baba Nanak, one of the most sacred places of the Sikhs, is situated on the banks of river Ravi. Three famous Gurudwaras at Dera Baba Nanak are Sri Darbar Sahib, Sri Chola Sahib and Tahli Sahib (Gurudwara of BaBa Sri Chand ji) eldest son of Guru Nanak, the first Sikh Guru. Guru Nanak, the first Sikh Guru settled and is believed to have "mingled with the Almighty" near the village Pakhoke Mehmaran, opposite to the present town and named it Kartarpur - a town which lies over the border in Pakistan. The Bedis (Khatris), descendants of Guru Nanak built a new town and named it Dera Baba Nanak after their ancestor.

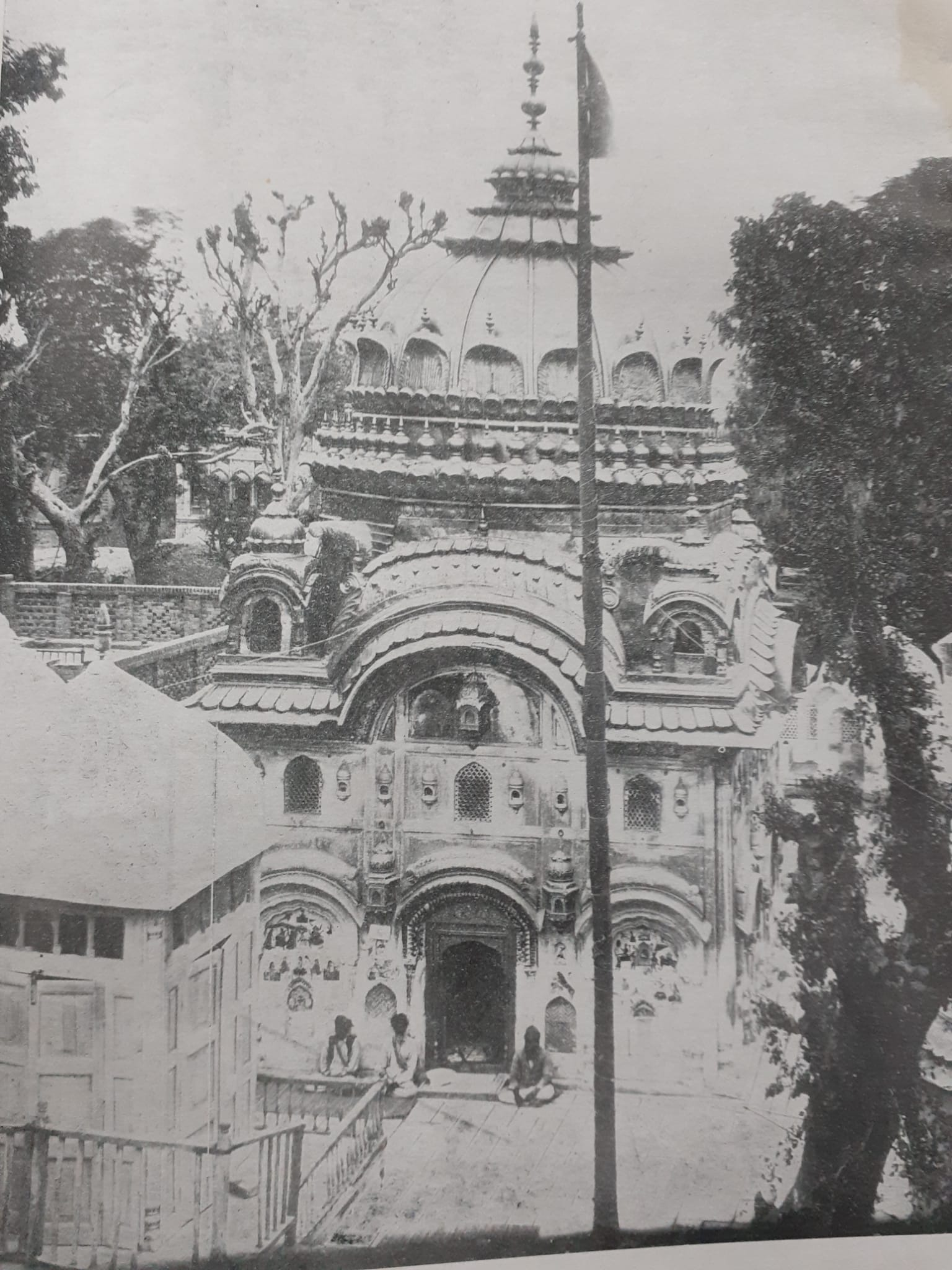
Photograph of a Sikh shrine at Dera Baba Nanak, from the 1930 first edition of Mahan Kosh

There are many Bedi descendants of Guru Nanak at Dera Baba Nanak, located near Kartarpur. Much of the land at Dera Baba Nanak is owned by Nanak's descendants and a robe, known as a chola sahib, with Quranic inscriptions said to have been owned by Nanak is kept here. The robe is believed to have been worn by Guru Nanak during his udasi (travels) to Mecca and Medina in Arabia. The robe was passed-down in four subsequent generations of descendants until it was preserved as a sacred relic. In 1895, Mirza Ghulam Ahmad, the Ahmadiyya prophet, examined the robe in an attempt to prove that Guru Nanak was a Muslim.

The town has a number of Gurdwaras. Pilgrims come to this town in large numbers. Dera Baba Nanak was made the headquarters of the newly created Tehsil of Dera Baba Nanak.

Gurudwara Sri Darbar Sahib was built in commemoration of Guru Nanak. He came here after his first Udasi (tour) during December 1515 AD to see members of his family. His wife Mata Sulakkhani and his two sons Sri Chand and Lakhmi Chand had come to stay here in their maternal home at Pakho-Ke-Randhawa near Dera Baba Nanak, where Lala Mool Raj, father–in–law of Guru Nanak, was working as a Patwari.

== Gallery ==
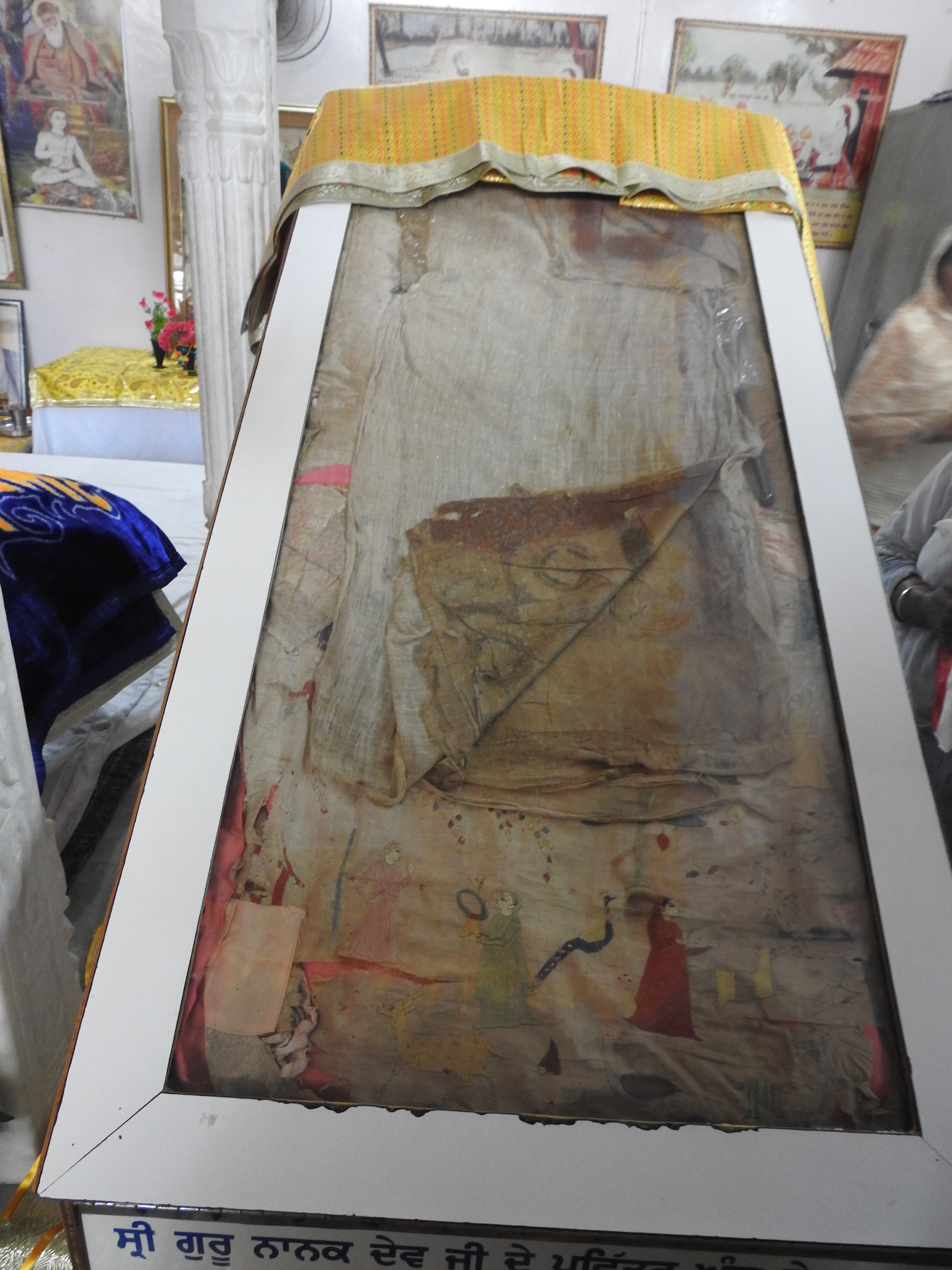
Garments of Guru Nanak preserved at Gurudwara Sri Chola Sahib

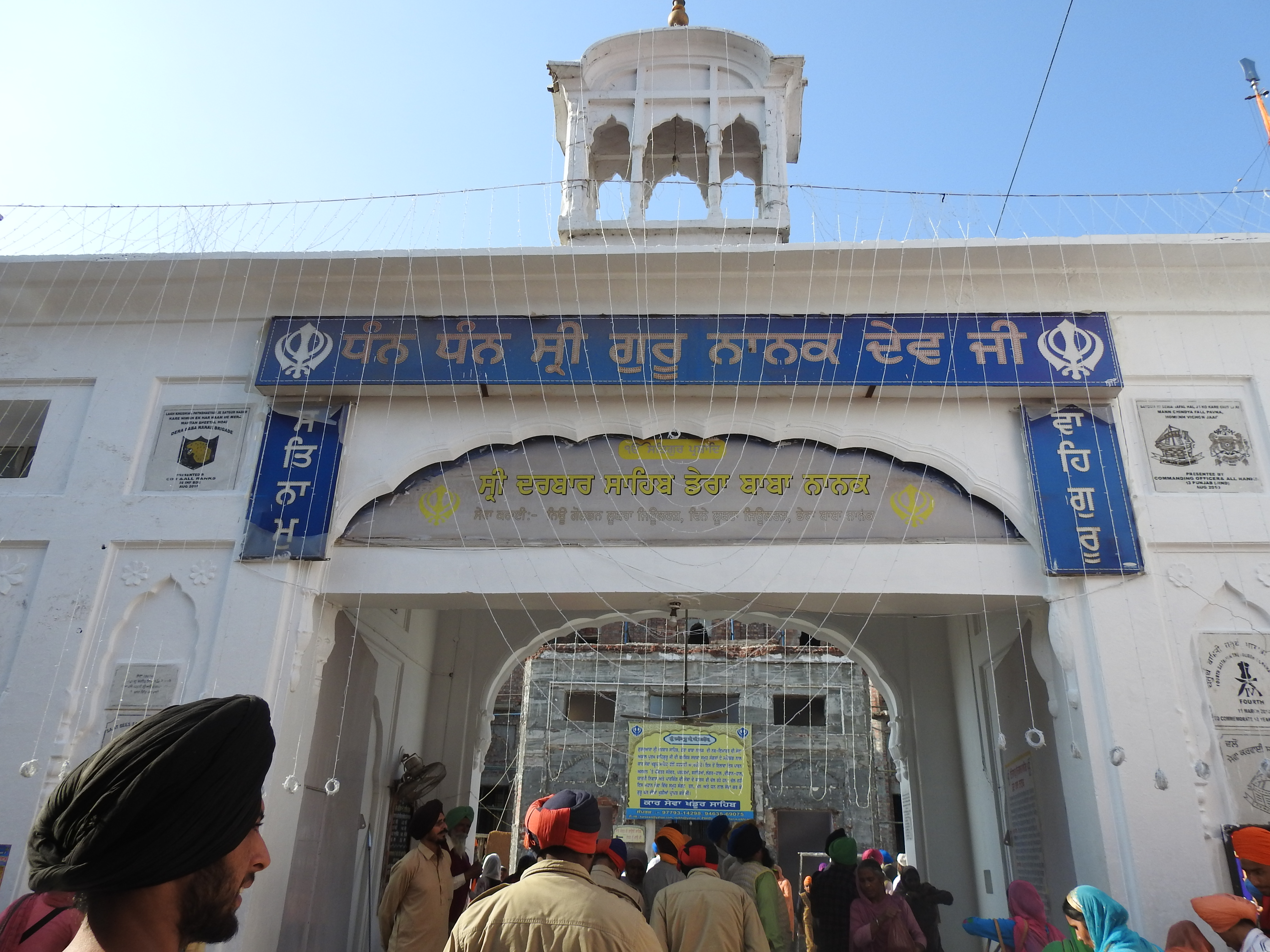
Gurudwara Sri Chola Sahib, Dera Baba Nanak

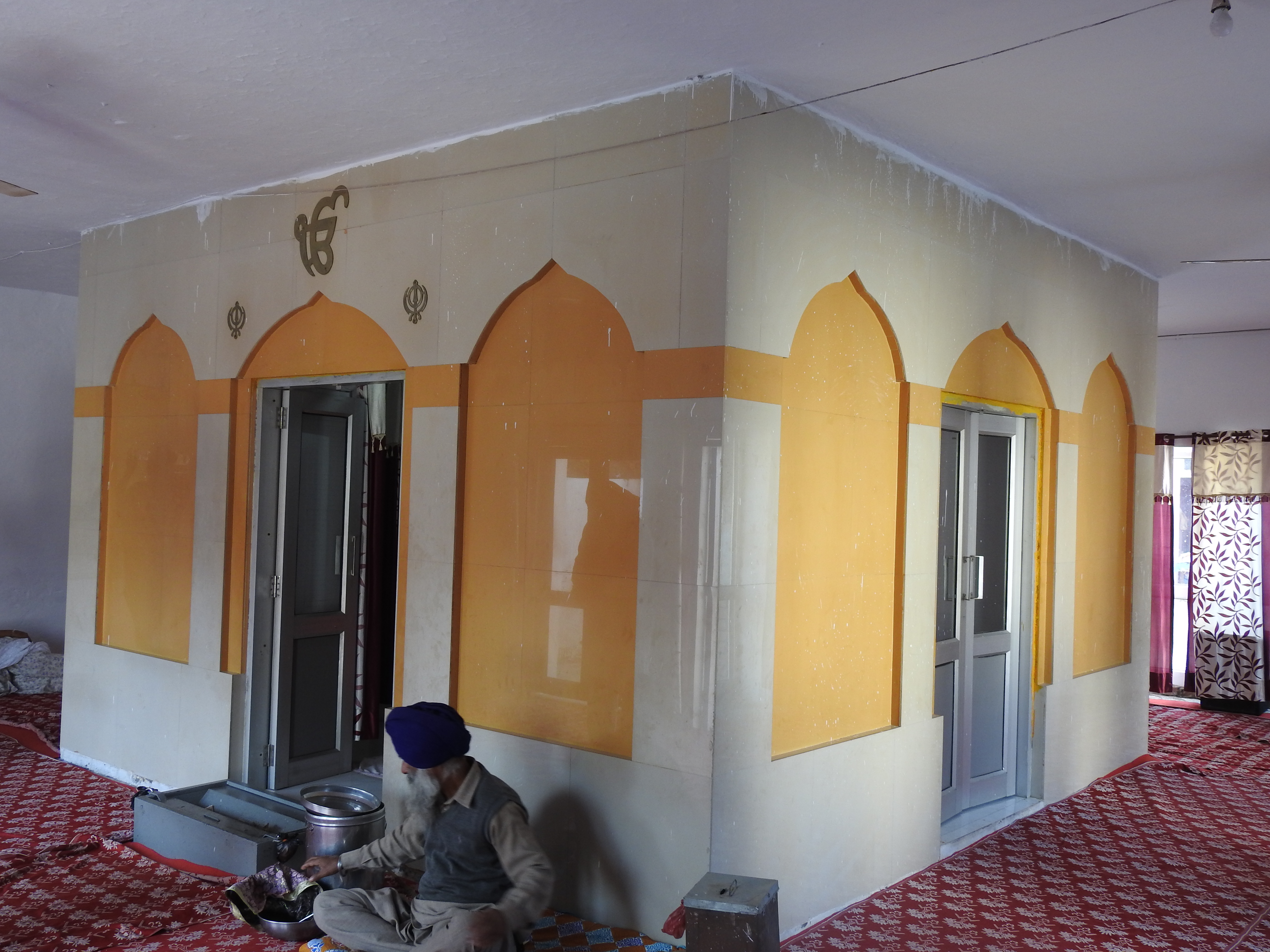
Inner view of Gurudwara Chola Sahib, Dera Baba Nanak

== Notable people ==
- Sujan Singh, a Punjabi story writer
- Satwant Singh, one of the bodyguards responsible for the assassination of Indira Gandhi

== Villages ==
- Alawalwala
- Ali Nangal
- Arli Bhan
- Bhagtana Boharwala
- Bomb
- Chainewal
- Dehar
- Dharowali
- Dhesian
- Gunia
- Hardowal
- Jaurian Kalan
- Jiwan Nangal
- Khanna Chamaran
- Khawaja Wardag (Dera Pathana)
- Kotli Dayaram
- Loharanwali
- Maitla
- Mera Ransinke
- Pabbarali
- Pokhoke Dera Baba Nanak
- Rajeke
- Ransinke Tilla
- Sadhanwali
- Sangtawal
- Shahpur Goraya
- Sharfkot
- Talwandi Hinduan
- Talwandi Rama
- Tapala
- Tarowali
- Tarpala
- Udhowali Kalan
- Udhowali Khurd
- Veroke
