= Rasulpur, Jalandhar =

Rasulpur
- Village
- Country: India
- State: Punjab
- District: Jalandhar
- Tehsil: Nakodar

Government
  - Type: Panchayat raj
  - Body: Gram panchayat

Area
  - Total: 71.75 ha (177.3 acres)

Population (2011)
  - Total: 659; 332/327 ♂/♀
  - Scheduled Castes: 549; 281/268 ♂/♀
  - Total Households: 128

Languages
  - Official: Punjabi
- Time zone: UTC+5:30 (IST)
- ISO 3166 code: IN-PB
- Website: jalandhar.gov.in

Rasulpur is a village in Nakodar in Jalandhar district of Punjab State, India. It is located 3 kilometres (1.9 mi) from sub district headquarter and 21 kilometres (13 mi) from district headquarter. The village is administrated by Sarpanch an elected representative of the village.

== Demography ==
As of 2011, the village has a total number of 128 houses and a population of 659 of which 332 are males while 327 are females. According to the report published by Census India in 2011, out of the total population of the village 549 people are from Schedule Caste and the village does not have any Schedule Tribe population so far.

== See also ==
- List of villages in India
