= Tut Shersingh =

Tut Sher Singh
- Village
- Location in Punjab, India Tut Sher Singh (India)
- Coordinates: 31.0683532°N 75.3779809°E
- Country: India
- State: Punjab
- District: Jalandhar
- Tehsil: Nakodar

Government
  - Type: Panchayat raj
  - Body: Gram panchayat
- Elevation: 240 m (790 ft)

Population (2011)
  - Total: 571
- Sex ratio 294/277 ♂/♀

Languages
  - Official: Punjabi
- Time zone: UTC+5:30 (IST)
- ISO 3166 code: IN-PB
- Vehicle registration: PB- 08
- Website: jalandhar.nic.in

Tut Sher Singh is a village in Nakodar in Jalandhar district of Punjab State, India. It is located 4 kilometres (2.5 mi) from Nakodar, 12 kilometres (7.5 mi) from Kapurthala, 38 kilometres (24 mi) from district headquarter Jalandhar and 166 kilometres (103 mi) from state capital Chandigarh. The village is administrated by a sarpanch who is an elected representative of village as per Panchayati raj (India).

== Demography ==
As of 2011, The village has a total number of 118 houses and population of 571 of which include 294 are males while 277 are females according to the report published by Census India in 2011. Literacy rate of the village is 85.08%, higher than state average of 80.36%. The population of children under the age of 6 years is 55 which is 9.63% of total population of the village, and child sex ratio is approximately 964 higher than the state average of 846.

Most of the people are from Schedule Caste which constiTalwandi Sanghraes 43.61% of total population in the village. The town does not have any Schedule Tribe population so far.

As per census 2011, 236 people were engaged in work activities out of the total population of the village which includes 170 males and 66 females. According to census survey report 2011, 94.07% workers describe their work as main work and 5.93% workers are involved in marginal activity providing livelihood for less than 6 months.

== Transport ==
Nakodar railway station is the nearest train station. The village is 72 kilometres (45 mi) away from domestic airport in Ludhiana and the nearest international airport is located in Chandigarh also Sri Guru Ram Dass Jee International Airport is the second nearest airport which is 116 kilometres (72 mi) away in Amritsar.

== See also ==
- List of villages in India
