= Yusafpur Allewal =

- Village
- Location in Punjab, India Yusafpur Allewal (India)
- Coordinates: 31.1489691°N 75.1016676°E
- Country: India
- State: Punjab
- District: Jalandhar
- Tehsil: Nakodar

Government
  - Type: Panchayat raj
  - Body: Gram panchayat
- Elevation: 240 m (790 ft)

Population (2011)
  - Total: 179
- Sex ratio 93/86 ♂/♀

Languages
  - Official: Punjabi
- Time zone: UTC+5:30 (IST)
- ISO 3166 code: IN-PB
- Vehicle registration: PB- 08
- Website: jalandhar.nic.in

Yusafpur Allewal is a village in Nakodar in Jalandhar district of Punjab State, India. It is located 31 kilometres (19 mi) from Nakodar, 39 kilometres (24 mi) from Kapurthala, 52 kilometres (32 mi) from district headquarter Jalandhar and 194 kilometres (121 mi) from state capital Chandigarh. The village is administrated by a sarpanch who is an elected representative of village as per Panchayati raj (India).

== Demography ==
As of 2011, The village has a total number of 30 houses and population of 179 of which include 93 are males while 86 are females according to the report published by Census India in 2011. Literacy rate of the village is 46.71%, lower than state average of 80.36%. The population of children under the age of 6 years is 27 which is 15.08% of total population of the village, and child sex ratio is approximately 500 lower than the state average of 846.

Most of the people are from Schedule Caste which constiTalwandi Sanghraes 81.01% of total population in the village. The town does not have any Schedule Tribe population so far.

As per census 2011, 91 people were engaged in work activities out of the total population of the village which includes 48 males and 43 females. According to census survey report 2011, 98.90% workers describe their work as main work and 1.10% workers are involved in marginal activity providing livelihood for less than 6 months.

== Transport ==
Nakodar railway station is the nearest train station. The village is 100 kilometres (62 mi) away from domestic airport in Ludhiana and the nearest international airport is located in Chandigarh also Sri Guru Ram Dass Jee International Airport is the second nearest airport which is 93 kilometres (58 mi) away in Amritsar.

== See also ==
- List of villages in India
