= Jagral =

- Village
- Location in Punjab, India Jagral (India)
- Coordinates: 31.2294375°N 75.5703216°E
- Country: India
- State: Punjab
- District: Jalandhar

Government
  - Type: Panchayat raj
  - Body: Gram panchayat
- Elevation: 623 m (2,044 ft)

Population
  - Total: 1,064

Languages
  - Official: Punjabi
- Time zone: UTC+5:30 (IST)
- PIN: 144020
- telephone: 0181
- ISO 3166 code: IN-PB
- Vehicle registration: PB- 08
- Post office: jamsher khas
- Website: jalandhar.nic.in

Jagral is a village in Jalandhar district of Punjab State, India. It is located 16 kilometres (9.9 mi) from district headquarter Jalandhar and 152 kilometres (94 mi) from state capital Chandigarh. The village is administrated by a sarpanch who is an elected representative of village as per Panchayati raj (India).

The villages of Barsal, Shahpur and Hamiri Khera are located nearby.

== See also ==
- List of villages in India
