= Shahpur, Jalandhar =

Shahpur
- Village
- Country: India
- State: Punjab
- District: Jalandhar
- Tehsil: Nakodar

Government
  - Type: Panchayat raj
  - Body: Gram panchayat

Area
  - Total: 110 ha (270 acres)

Population (2011)
  - Total: 166; 84/82 ♂/♀
  - Scheduled Castes: 88; 49/39 ♂/♀
  - Total Households: 31

Languages
  - Official: Punjabi
- Time zone: UTC+5:30 (IST)
- ISO 3166 code: IN-PB
- Website: jalandhar.gov.in

Shahpur is a village in Nakodar in Jalandhar district of Punjab State, India. It is located 18 kilometres (11 mi) from sub district headquarter and 30 kilometres (19 mi) from district headquarter. The village is administrated by Sarpanch an elected representative of the village.

== Demography ==
As of 2011, the village has a total number of 31 houses and a population of 166 of which 84 are males while 82 are females. According to the report published by Census India in 2011, out of the total population of the village 88 people are from Schedule Caste and the village does not have any Schedule Tribe population so far.

== See also ==
- List of villages in India
