= Saidpur Theh =

- Village
- Location in Punjab, India Saidpur Theh (India)
- Coordinates: 31.0502776°N 76.0390806°E
- Country: India
- State: Punjab
- District: Shaheed Bhagat Singh Nagar

Government
  - Type: Panchayat raj
  - Body: Gram panchayat

Population (2011)
  - Total: 97
- Sex ratio 46/51 ♂/♀

Languages
  - Official: Punjabi
- Time zone: UTC+5:30 (IST)
- PIN: 144518
- ISO 3166 code: IN-PB
- Post office: Garcha (S.O)
- Website: nawanshahr.nic.in

Saidpur Theh is a village in Shaheed Bhagat Singh Nagar district of Punjab State, India. It is located 4 kilometres (2.5 mi) away from sub post office Garcha, 13 kilometres (8.1 mi) from Nawanshahr, 6.6 kilometres (4.1 mi) from district headquarter Shaheed Bhagat Singh Nagar and 100 kilometres (62 mi) from state capital Chandigarh. The village is administrated by Sarpanch an elected representative of the village.

== Demography ==
As of 2011, Saidpur Theh has a total number of 20 houses and population of 97 of which 46 include are males while 51 are females according to the report published by Census India in 2011. The literacy rate of Saidpur Theh is 81.40% higher than the state average of 75.84%. The population of children under the age of 6 years is 11 which is 11.34% of total population of Saidpur Theh, and child sex ratio is approximately 833 as compared to Punjab state average of 846.

As per the report published by Census India in 2011, 36 people were engaged in work activities out of the total population of Saidpur Theh which includes 30 males and 6 females. According to census survey report 2011, 100% workers describe their work as main work and 0% workers are involved in Marginal activity providing livelihood for less than 6 months.

== Education ==
The village has no school and children either travel or walk to other villages for schooling often covering between 8 and 10 kilometres (5.0 and 6.2 mi). KC Engineering College and Doaba Khalsa Trust Group Of Institutions are the nearest colleges. Industrial Training Institute for women (ITI Nawanshahr) is 19 kilometres (12 mi). The village is 75 kilometres (47 mi) away from Chandigarh University, 58 kilometres (36 mi) from Indian Institute of Technology and 48.8 kilometres (30.3 mi) away from Lovely Professional University.

List of schools nearby:

- Govt Primary School, Sadhpur
- Govt High School, Saidpur Kalan
- Govt Senior Secondary School, Ladhana Jhikka
- Govt High School, Jhander Kalan
- Guru Ram Dass Public School, Cheta

== Transport ==
Nawanshahr train station is the nearest train station however, Garhshankar Junction railway station is 29 kilometres (18 mi) away from the village. Sahnewal Airport is the nearest domestic airport which located 57 kilometres (35 mi) away in Ludhiana and the nearest international airport is located in Chandigarh also Sri Guru Ram Dass Jee International Airport is the second nearest airport which is 158 kilometres (98 mi) away in Amritsar.

== See also ==
- List of villages in India
