= Rasulpur, Shaheed Bhagat Singh Nagar =

Rasulpur
- Village
- Location in Punjab, India Rasulpur (India)
- Coordinates: 31.1414347°N 76.0134552°E
- Country: India
- State: Punjab
- District: Shaheed Bhagat Singh Nagar

Government
  - Type: Panchayat raj
  - Body: Gram panchayat
- Elevation: 251 m (823 ft)

Population (2011)
  - Total: 1,283
- Sex ratio 626/657 ♂/♀

Languages
  - Official: Punjabi
- Time zone: UTC+5:30 (IST)
- PIN: 144513
- Telephone code: 01884
- ISO 3166 code: IN-PB
- Post office: Musapur (S.O)
- Website: nawanshahr.nic.in

Rasulpur is a village in Shaheed Bhagat Singh Nagar district of Punjab State, India. It is located 3.3 kilometres (2.1 mi) away from sub post office Musapur, 9.8 kilometres (6.1 mi) from Nawanshahr, 7 kilometres (4.3 mi) from district headquarter Shaheed Bhagat Singh Nagar and 103 kilometres (64 mi) from state capital Chandigarh. The village is administrated by Sarpanch an elected representative of the village.

== Demography ==
As of 2011, Rasulpur has a total number of 285 houses and population of 1283 of which 626 include are males while 657 are females according to the report published by Census India in 2011. The literacy rate of Rasulpur is 84.05%, higher than the state average of 75.84%. The population of children under the age of 6 years is 136 which is 10.60% of total population of Rasulpur, and child sex ratio is approximately 789 as compared to Punjab state average of 846.

Most of the people are from Schedule Caste which constitutes 51.91% of total population in Rasulpur. The town does not have any Schedule Tribe population so far.

As per the report published by Census India in 2011, 309 people were engaged in work activities out of the total population of Rasulpur which includes 292 males and 17 females. According to census survey report 2011, 97.73% workers describe their work as main work and 2.27% workers are involved in Marginal activity providing livelihood for less than 6 months.

== Education ==
The village has a Punjabi medium, co-ed primary school established in 1954. The school provide mid-day meal per Indian Midday Meal Scheme. As per Right of Children to Free and Compulsory Education Act the school provide free education to children between the ages of 6 and 14.

Amardeep Singh Shergill Memorial college Mukandpur, KC Engineering College and Doaba Khalsa Trust Group Of Institutions are the nearest colleges. Industrial Training Institute for women (ITI Nawanshahr) is 14 kilometres (8.7 mi). The village is 82.8 kilometres (51.4 mi) away from Chandigarh University, 61 kilometres (38 mi) from Indian Institute of Technology and 36.8 kilometres (22.9 mi) away from Lovely Professional University.

== Transport ==
Banga train station is the nearest train station however, Garhshankar Junction railway station is 20 kilometres (12 mi) away from the village. Sahnewal Airport is the nearest domestic airport which located 64 kilometres (40 mi) away in Ludhiana and the nearest international airport is located in Chandigarh also Sri Guru Ram Dass Jee International Airport is the second nearest airport which is 146 kilometres (91 mi) away in Amritsar.

== See also ==
- List of villages in India
