= Sukar, SBS Nagar =

Sukar
- Village
- Location in Punjab, India Sukar (India)
- Coordinates: 31.1113079°N 75.941705°E
- Country: India
- State: Punjab
- District: Shaheed Bhagat Singh Nagar

Government
  - Type: Panchayat raj
  - Body: Gram panchayat
- Elevation: 254 m (833 ft)

Population (2011)
  - Total: 331
- Sex ratio 169/162 ♂/♀

Languages
  - Official: Punjabi
- Time zone: UTC+5:30 (IST)
- PIN: 144507
- Telephone code: 01823
- ISO 3166 code: IN-PB
- Post office: Mukandpur (S.O)
- Website: nawanshahr.nic.in

Sukar is a village in Shaheed Bhagat Singh Nagar district of Punjab State, India. It is located 2.7 kilometres (1.7 mi) away from sub post office Mukandpur, 20 kilometres (12 mi) from Nawanshahr, 12 kilometres (7.5 mi) from district headquarter Shaheed Bhagat Singh Nagar and 115 kilometres (71 mi) from state capital Chandigarh. The village is administrated by Sarpanch an elected representative of the village.

== Demography ==
As of 2011, Sukar has a total number of 72 houses and population of 331 of which 169 include are males while 162 are females according to the report published by Census India in 2011. The literacy rate of Sukar is 82.89% higher than the state average of 75.84%. The population of children under the age of 6 years is 33 which is 9.97% of total population of Sukar, and child sex ratio is approximately 650 as compared to Punjab state average of 846.

Most of the people are from Schedule Caste which constitutes 79.15% of total population in Sukar. The town does not have any Schedule Tribe population so far.

As per the report published by Census India in 2011, 96 people were engaged in work activities out of the total population of Sukar which includes 93 males and 3 females. According to census survey report 2011, 93.75% workers describe their work as main work and 6.25% workers are involved in Marginal activity providing livelihood for less than 6 months.

== Education ==
The village has a Punjabi medium, co-ed primary school established in 1976. The school provide mid-day meal per Indian Midday Meal Scheme. As per Right of Children to Free and Compulsory Education Act the school provide free education to children between the ages of 6 and 14.

Amardeep Singh Shergill Memorial college Mukandpur, KC Engineering College and Doaba Khalsa Trust Group Of Institutions are the nearest colleges. Industrial Training Institute for women (ITI Nawanshahr) is 26 kilometres (16 mi). The village is 90 kilometres (56 mi) away from Chandigarh University, 73 kilometres (45 mi) from Indian Institute of Technology and 30 kilometres (19 mi) away from Lovely Professional University.

== Transport ==
Nawanshahr train station is the nearest train station however, Garhshankar Junction railway station is 23 kilometres (14 mi) away from the village. Sahnewal Airport is the nearest domestic airport which located 50 kilometres (31 mi) away in Ludhiana and the nearest international airport is located in Chandigarh also Sri Guru Ram Dass Jee International Airport is the second nearest airport which is 140 kilometres (87 mi) away in Amritsar.

== See also ==
- List of villages in India
