= Jethu Mazara =

- Village
- Location in Punjab, India Jethu Mazara (India)
- Coordinates: 31.1062908°N 76.144532°E
- Country: India
- State: Punjab
- District: Shaheed Bhagat Singh Nagar

Government
  - Type: Panchayat raj
  - Body: Gram panchayat
- Elevation: 355 m (1,165 ft)

Population (2011)
  - Total: 1,420
- Sex ratio 732/688 ♂/♀

Languages
  - Official: Punjabi
- Time zone: UTC+5:30 (IST)
- PIN: 144516
- Telephone code: 01823
- ISO 3166 code: IN-PB
- Post office: Langroya
- Website: nawanshahr.nic.in

Jethu Mazara is a village in Shaheed Bhagat Singh Nagar district of Punjab State, India. It is located 2.6 kilometres (1.6 mi) away from postal head office Langroya, 4.4 kilometres (2.7 mi) from Nawanshahr, 11.6 kilometres (7.2 mi) from district headquarter Shaheed Bhagat Singh Nagar and 87.6 kilometres (54.4 mi) from state capital Chandigarh. The village is administrated by Sarpanch an elected representative of the village.

== Demography ==
As of 2011, Jethu Mazara has a total number of 295 houses and population of 1420 of which 732 include are males while 688 are females according to the report published by Census India in 2011. The literacy rate of Jethu Mazara is 77.91%, higher than the state average of 75.84%. The population of children under the age of 6 years is 139 which is 9.79% of total population of Jethu Mazara, and child sex ratio is approximately 782 as compared to Punjab state average of 846.

Most of the people are from Schedule Caste which constitutes 41.69% of total population in Jethu Mazara. The town does not have any Schedule Tribe population so far.

As per the report published by Census India in 2011, 592 people were engaged in work activities out of the total population of Jethu Mazara which includes 447 males and 145 females. According to census survey report 2011, 83.11% workers describe their work as main work and 16.89% workers are involved in Marginal activity providing livelihood for less than 6 months.

== Education ==
The village has a Punjabi medium, co-ed upper primary school founded in 1996. The schools provide mid-day meal as per Indian Midday Meal Scheme and the meal prepared in school premises. As per Right of Children to Free and Compulsory Education Act the school provide free education to children between the ages of 6 and 14.

KC Engineering College and Doaba Khalsa Trust Group Of Institutions are the nearest colleges. Industrial Training Institute for women (ITI Nawanshahr) is 2.6 kilometres (1.6 mi) away from the village. Lovely Professional University is 48 kilometres (30 mi) away from the village.

== Transport ==
Nawanshahr railway station is the nearest train station however, Garhshankar Junction railway station is 15.7 kilometres (9.8 mi) away from the village. Sahnewal Airport is the nearest domestic airport which located 57 kilometres (35 mi) away in Ludhiana and the nearest international airport is located in Chandigarh also Sri Guru Ram Dass Jee International Airport is the second nearest airport which is 157 kilometres (98 mi) away in Amritsar.

== See also ==
- List of villages in India
