= Jalwaha =

- Village
- Location in Punjab, India Jalwaha (India)
- Coordinates: 31.0727254°N 76.1249274°E
- Country: India
- State: Punjab
- District: Shaheed Bhagat Singh Nagar

Government
  - Type: Panchayat raj
  - Body: Gram panchayat
- Elevation: 355 m (1,165 ft)

Population (2011)
  - Total: 810
- Sex ratio 405/405 ♂/♀

Languages
  - Official: Punjabi
- Time zone: UTC+5:30 (IST)
- PIN: 144515
- Telephone code: 01823
- ISO 3166 code: IN-PB
- Post office: Lassara
- Website: nawanshahr.nic.in

Jalwaha is a village in Shaheed Bhagat Singh Nagar district of Punjab State, India. It is located 29 kilometres (18 mi) away from postal head office Lassara, 16 kilometres (9.9 mi) from Nawanshahr, 19.7 kilometres (12.2 mi) from district headquarter Shaheed Bhagat Singh Nagar and 87.7 kilometres (54.5 mi) from state capital Chandigarh. The village is administrated by Sarpanch an elected representative of the village.

== Demography ==
As of 2011, Jalwaha has a total number of 161 houses and population of 810 of which 405 include are males while 405 are females according to the report published by Census India in 2011. The literacy rate of Jalwaha is 42.11%, higher than the state average of 75.84%. The population of children under the age of 6 years is 100 which is 12.35% of total population of Jalwaha, and child sex ratio is approximately 1083 as compared to Punjab state average of 846.

Most of the people are from Schedule Caste which constitutes 51.23% of total population in Jalwaha. The town does not have any Schedule Tribe population so far.

As per the report published by Census India in 2011, 284 people were engaged in work activities out of the total population of Jalwaha which includes 232 males and 52 females. According to census survey report 2011, 75% workers describe their work as main work and 25% workers are involved in Marginal activity providing livelihood for less than 6 months.

== Education ==
The village has a Punjabi medium, co-ed primary school founded in 1953 and an elementary school. The schools provide mid-day meal as per Indian Midday Meal Scheme and the meal prepared in school premises. As per Right of Children to Free and Compulsory Education Act the school provide free education to children between the ages of 6 and 14.

KC Engineering College and Doaba Khalsa Trust Group Of Institutions are the nearest colleges. Industrial Training Institute for women (ITI Nawanshahr) is 13 kilometres (8.1 mi) away from the village. Lovely Professional University is 60 kilometres (37 mi) away from the village.

== Transport ==
Nawanshahr railway station is the nearest train station however, Garhshankar Junction railway station is 28 kilometres (17 mi) away from the village. Sahnewal Airport is the nearest domestic airport which located 48 kilometres (30 mi) away in Ludhiana and the nearest international airport is located in Chandigarh also Sri Guru Ram Dass Jee International Airport is the second nearest airport which is 168 kilometres (104 mi) away in Amritsar.

== See also ==
- List of villages in India
