= Kamam, SBS Nagar =

Kamam ਕਮਾਮ ਕਮਾਮ
- Village
- Kamam
- Location in Punjab, India Kamam ਕਮਾਮ (India)
- Coordinates: 31.115546°N 76.023675°E
- Country: India
- State: Punjab
- District: Shaheed Bhagat Singh Nagar

Government
  - Type: Panchayat raj
  - Body: Gram panchayat
- Elevation: 254 m (833 ft)

Population (2011)
  - Total: 1,958
- Sex ratio 982/876 ♂/♀

Languages
  - Official: Punjabi
- Time zone: UTC+5:30 (IST)
- PIN: 144513
- Telephone code: 01823
- ISO 3166 code: IN-PB
- Post office: Musapur
- Website: nawanshahr.nic.in

Kamam (ਕਮਾਮ) is a village in Shaheed Bhagat Singh Nagar district of Punjab State, India. It is located 3.3 kilometres (2.1 mi) away from postal head office Musapur, 10 kilometres (6.2 mi) from Nawanshahr, 3.3 kilometres (2.1 mi) from district headquarter Shaheed Bhagat Singh Nagar and 103 kilometres (64 mi) from state capital Chandigarh. The village is administrated by Sarpanch, an elected representative of the village.

== Demography ==
As of 2011, Kamam has a total number of 383 houses and population of 1958 of which 982 include are males while 976 are females according to the report published by Census India in 2011. The literacy rate of Kamam is 80.51%, higher than the state average of 75.84%. The population of children under the age of 6 years is 203 which is 10.37% of total population of Kamam, and child sex ratio is approximately 1183 as compared to Punjab state average of 846.

Most of the people are from Schedule Caste which constitutes 70.63% of total population in Kamam. The town does not have any Schedule Tribe population so far.

As per the report published by Census India in 2011, 507 people were engaged in work activities out of the total population of Kamam which includes 481 males and 26 females. According to census survey report 2011, 69.63% workers describe their work as main work and 30.37% workers are involved in Marginal activity providing livelihood for less than 6 months.

== Education ==
The village has a Punjabi medium, co-ed primary school founded in 1911. The school provide mid-day meal as per Indian Midday Meal Scheme. As per Right of Children to Free and Compulsory Education Act the school provide free education to children between the ages of 6 and 14.

Amardeep Singh Shergill Memorial college Mukandpur and Sikh National College Banga are the nearest colleges. Lovely Professional University is 40 kilometres (25 mi) away from the village.

== Transport ==
Khatkar Kalan Jhandaji railway station is the nearest train station however, Garhshankar Junction railway station is 22.5 kilometres (14.0 mi) away from the village. Sahnewal Airport is the nearest domestic airport which located 59 kilometres (37 mi) away in Ludhiana and the nearest international airport is located in Chandigarh. Also Sri Guru Ram Dass Jee International Airport is the second nearest airport which is 144 kilometres (89 mi) away in Amritsar.

== See also ==
- List of villages in India
