= Dhandhua =

- Village
- Location in Punjab, India Dhandhua (India)
- Coordinates: 31.18659°N 75.9139138°E
- Country: India
- State: Punjab
- District: Shaheed Bhagat Singh Nagar

Government
  - Type: Panchayat raj
  - Body: Gram panchayat

Population (2011)
  - Total: 474
- Sex ratio 247/227 ♂/♀

Languages
  - Official: Punjabi
- Time zone: UTC+5:30 (IST)
- PIN: 144504
- Telephone code: 01823
- ISO 3166 code: IN-PB
- Post office: Behram
- Website: nawanshahr.nic.in

Dhandhua is a village in Shaheed Bhagat Singh Nagar district of Punjab State, India. It is located 9.3 kilometres (5.8 mi) away from postal head office Nawanshahar, 7 kilometres (4.3 mi) from Garhshankar, 20 kilometres (12 mi) from district headquarter Shaheed Bhagat Singh Nagar and 113 kilometres (70 mi) from state capital Chandigarh. The village is administrated by Sarpanch an elected representative of the village.

== Demography ==
As of 2011, Dhandhua has a total number of 104 houses and population of 474 of which 247 include are males while 227 are females according to the report published by Census India in 2011. The literacy rate of Dhandhua is 80.29%, higher than the state average of 75.84%. The population of children under the age of 6 years is 58 which is 12.24% of total population of Dhandhua, and child sex ratio is approximately 1071 as compared to Punjab state average of 846.

Most of the people are from Schedule Caste which constitutes 69.41% of total population in Dhandhua. The town does not have any Schedule Tribe population so far.

As per the report published by Census India in 2011, 133 people were engaged in work activities out of the total population of Dhandhua which includes 130 males and 3 females. According to census survey report 2011, 99.25% workers describe their work as main work and 0.75% workers are involved in Marginal activity providing livelihood for less than 6 months.

== Landmarks ==
The village has a Government Seed Fish Farm which produced and supplied 90.06 lakh seed fish in 2015, and broke the records of previous years. Gurudwara Singh Sabha, Gurudwara shri Guru Ravidas ji and Shaheed Sardar Jagmail Singh Shergill's temple are religious sites.

== Education ==
Amardeep Singh Shergill Memorial college Mukandpur and Sikh National College Banga are the nearest colleges. Lovely Professional University is 25 kilometres (16 mi) away from the village.

== Transport ==
Mallo Pota railway station is the nearest train station however, Phagwara Junction railway station is 17 kilometres (11 mi) away from the village. Sahnewal Airport is the nearest domestic airport which located 67 kilometres (42 mi) away in Ludhiana and the nearest international airport is located in Chandigarh also Sri Guru Ram Dass Jee International Airport is the second nearest airport which is 134 kilometres (83 mi) away in Amritsar.

== See also ==
- List of villages in India
