= Dharamkot, SBS Nagar =

Dharamkot
- Village
- Location in Punjab, India Dharamkot (India)
- Coordinates: 31.0904405°N 76.0868459°E
- Country: India
- State: Punjab
- District: Shaheed Bhagat Singh Nagar

Government
  - Type: Panchayat raj
  - Body: Gram panchayat
- Elevation: 355 m (1,165 ft)

Population (2011)
  - Total: 1,077
- Sex ratio 540/537 ♂/♀

Languages
  - Official: Punjabi
- Time zone: UTC+5:30 (IST)
- PIN: 144421
- Telephone code: 01823
- ISO 3166 code: IN-PB
- Post office: Sahlon
- Website: nawanshahr.nic.in

Dharamkot is a village in Shaheed Bhagat Singh Nagar district of Punjab State, India. It is located 6.4 kilometres (4.0 mi) away from postal head office Sahlon, 6.2 kilometres (3.9 mi) from Nawanshahr, 6.8 kilometres (4.2 mi) from district headquarter Shaheed Bhagat Singh Nagar and 95.2 kilometres (59.2 mi) from state capital Chandigarh. The village is administrated by Sarpanch an elected representative of the village.

== Demography ==
As of 2011, Dharamkot has a total number of 216 houses and population of 1077 of which 540 include are males while 537 are females according to the report published by Census India in 2011. The literacy rate of Dharamkot is 78.20%, higher than the state average of 75.84%. The population of children under the age of 6 years is 109 which is 10.12% of total population of Dharamkot, and child sex ratio is approximately 912 as compared to Punjab state average of 846.

Most of the people are from Schedule Caste which constitutes 38.44% of total population in Dharamkot. The town does not have any Schedule Tribe population so far.

As per the report published by Census India in 2011, 380 people were engaged in work activities out of the total population of Dharamkot which includes 325 males and 55 females. According to census survey report 2011, 89.74% workers describe their work as main work and 10.26% workers are involved in Marginal activity providing livelihood for less than 6 months.

== Education ==
The village has a Punjabi medium, co-ed primary with school founded in 1950. The schools provide mid-day meal as per Indian Midday Meal Scheme. The school provide free education to children between the ages of 6 and 14 as per Right of Children to Free and Compulsory Education Act. KC Engineering College and Doaba Khalsa Trust Group Of Institutions are the nearest colleges. Industrial Training Institute for women (ITI Nawanshahr) is 8.5 kilometres (5.3 mi) and Lovely Professional University is 48 kilometres (30 mi) away from the village.

== Transport ==
Nawanshahr railway station is the nearest train station however, Garhshankar Junction railway station is 19 kilometres (12 mi). The village is 52 kilometres (32 mi) away from Sahnewal Airport which is the nearest domestic airport located in Ludhiana and the nearest international airport is located in Chandigarh also Sri Guru Ram Dass Jee International Airport is the second nearest airport which is 156 kilometres (97 mi) away in Amritsar.

== See also ==
- List of villages in India
