= Shakohpur =

- Village
- Location in Punjab, India Shakohpur (India)
- Coordinates: 31.1001838°N 76.0439623°E
- Country: India
- State: Punjab
- District: Shaheed Bhagat Singh Nagar

Government
  - Type: Panchayat raj
  - Body: Gram panchayat
- Elevation: 254 m (833 ft)

Population (2011)
  - Total: 2,000
- Sex ratio 681/636 ♂/♀

Languages
  - Official: Punjabi
- Time zone: UTC+5:30 (IST)
- PIN: 144421
- Telephone code: 01823
- ISO 3166 code: IN-PB
- Post office: Sahlon (S.O)
- Website: nawanshahr.nic.in

Shakohpur is a village in Shaheed Bhagat Singh Nagar district of Punjab State, India. It is located 1.4 kilometres (0.87 mi) away from sub post office Sahlon, 7 kilometres (4.3 mi) from Nawanshahr, 1.3 kilometres (0.81 mi) from district headquarter Shaheed Bhagat Singh Nagar and 98 kilometres (61 mi) from state capital Chandigarh. The village is administrated by Sarpanch an elected representative of the village.

== Demography ==
As of 2011, Shakohpur has a total number of 273 houses and population of 1317 of which 681 include are males while 636 are females according to the report published by Census India in 2011. The literacy rate of Shakohpur is 85.55% higher than the state average of 75.84%. The population of children under the age of 6 years is 113 which is 8.58% of total population of Shakohpur, and child sex ratio is approximately 852 as compared to Punjab state average of 846.

Most of the people are from Schedule Caste which constitutes 54.59% of total population in Shakohpur. The town does not have any Schedule Tribe population so far.

As per the report published by Census India in 2011, 476 people were engaged in work activities out of the total population of Shakohpur which includes 430 males and 46 females. According to census survey report 2011, 91.60% workers describe their work as main work and 8.40% workers are involved in Marginal activity providing livelihood for less than 6 months.

== Education ==
The village has a Punjabi medium, co-ed primary school established in 1972. The school provide mid-day meal per Indian Midday Meal Scheme. As per Right of Children to Free and Compulsory Education Act the school provide free education to children between the ages of 6 and 14.

KC Engineering College and Doaba Khalsa Trust Group Of Institutions are the nearest colleges. Industrial Training Institute for women (ITI Nawanshahr) is 9.5 kilometres (5.9 mi). The village is 77 kilometres (48 mi) away from Chandigarh University, 56 kilometres (35 mi) from Indian Institute of Technology and 42 kilometres (26 mi) away from Lovely Professional University.

== Transport ==
Nawanshahr train station is the nearest train station however, Garhshankar Junction railway station is 19.7 kilometres (12.2 mi) away from the village. Sahnewal Airport is the nearest domestic airport which located 58.6 kilometres (36.4 mi) away in Ludhiana and the nearest international airport is located in Chandigarh also Sri Guru Ram Dass Jee International Airport is the second nearest airport which is 151 kilometres (94 mi) away in Amritsar.

== See also ==
- List of villages in India
