= Katarian =

- Village
- Location in Punjab, India Katarian (India)
- Coordinates: 31.2545826°N 75.9395677°E
- Country: India
- State: Punjab
- District: Shaheed Bhagat Singh Nagar

Government
  - Type: Panchayat raj
  - Body: Gram panchayat
- Elevation: 251 m (823 ft)

Population (2011)
  - Total: 1,407
- Sex ratio 716/691 ♂/♀

Languages
  - Official: Punjabi
- Time zone: UTC+5:30 (IST)
- PIN: 144503
- Telephone code: 01884
- ISO 3166 code: IN-PB
- Post office: Pharala
- Website: nawanshahr.nic.in

Katarian is a village in Shaheed Bhagat Singh Nagar district of Punjab State, India. It is located 7.3 kilometres (4.5 mi) away from postal head office Pharala, 24 kilometres (15 mi) from Nawanshahr, 22 kilometres (14 mi) from district headquarter Shaheed Bhagat Singh Nagar and 144 kilometres (89 mi) from state capital Chandigarh. The village is administrated by Sarpanch an elected representative of the village.

== Demography ==
As of 2011, Katarian has a total number of 256 houses and population of 1407 of which 716 include are males while 691 are females according to the report published by Census India in 2011. The literacy rate of Katarian is 81.08% higher than the state average of 75.84%. The population of children under the age of 6 years is 165 which is 11.73% of total population of Katarian, and child sex ratio is approximately 1012 as compared to Punjab state average of 846.

Most of the people are from Schedule Caste which constitutes 60.06% of total population in Katarian. The town does not have any Schedule Tribe population so far.

As per the report published by Census India in 2011, 401 people were engaged in work activities out of the total population of Katarian which includes 372 males and 29 females. According to census survey report 2011, 94.51% workers describe their work as main work and 5.49% workers are involved in Marginal activity providing livelihood for less than 6 months.

== Education ==
The village has a Punjabi medium, co-ed upper primary school established in 2001. The school provide mid-day meal as per Indian Midday Meal Scheme. As per Right of Children to Free and Compulsory Education Act the school provide free education to children between the ages of 6 and 14.

Amardeep Singh Shergill Memorial college Mukandpur and Sikh National College Banga are the nearest colleges. Industrial Training Institute for women (ITI Nawanshahr) is 66 kilometres (41 mi) The village is 72 kilometres (45 mi) from Indian Institute of Technology and 30 kilometres (19 mi) away from Lovely Professional University.

== Transport ==
Banga railway station is the nearest train station however, Garhshankar Junction railway station is 16 kilometres (9.9 mi) away from the village. Sahnewal Airport is the nearest domestic airport which located 72 kilometres (45 mi) away in Ludhiana and the nearest international airport is located in Chandigarh also Sri Guru Ram Dass Jee International Airport is the second nearest airport which is 139 kilometres (86 mi) away in Amritsar.

== See also ==
- List of villages in India
