= Tajowal =

Village in Punjab, India

- Village
- Location in Punjab, India Tajowal (India)
- Coordinates: 31.0254347°N 76.1968902°E
- Country: India
- State: Punjab
- District: Shaheed Bhagat Singh Nagar

Government
  - Type: Panchayat raj
  - Body: Gram panchayat
- Elevation: 355 m (1,165 ft)

Population (2011)
  - Total: 483
- Sex ratio 246/237 ♂/♀

Languages
  - Official: Punjabi
- Time zone: UTC+5:30 (IST)
- PIN: 144515
- Telephone code: 01823
- ISO 3166 code: IN-PB
- Post office: Dangarpur (S.O)
- Website: nawanshahr.nic.in

Tajowal is a village in Shaheed Bhagat Singh Nagar district of Punjab State, India. It is located 14 kilometres (8.7 mi) away from post office Rahon, 20 kilometres (12 mi) from Nawanshahr, 22 kilometres (14 mi) from district headquarter Shaheed Bhagat Singh Nagar and 82 kilometres (51 mi) from state capital Chandigarh. The village is administrated by Sarpanch an elected representative of the village.

== Demography ==
As of 2011, Tajowal has a total number of 89 houses and population of 483 of which 246 include are males while 237 are females according to the report published by Census India in 2011. The literacy rate of Tajowal is 79.76% higher than the state average of 75.84%. The population of children under the age of 6 years is 63 which is 13.04% of total population of Tajowal, and child sex ratio is approximately 703 as compared to Punjab state average of 846.

Most of the people are from Schedule Caste which constitutes 68.74% of total population in Tajowal. The town does not have any Schedule Tribe population so far.

As per the report published by Census India in 2011, 176 people were engaged in work activities out of the total population of Tajowal which includes 120 males and 56 females. According to census survey report 2011, 38.07% workers describe their work as main work and 61.93% workers are involved in Marginal activity providing livelihood for less than 6 months.

== Education ==
The village has a Punjabi medium, co-ed primary school established in 1970. The school provide mid-day meal per Indian Midday Meal Scheme. As per Right of Children to Free and Compulsory Education Act the school provide free education to children between the ages of 6 and 14.

KC Engineering College and Doaba Khalsa Trust Group Of Institutions are the nearest colleges. Industrial Training Institute for women (ITI Nawanshahr) is 16 kilometres (9.9 mi). The village is 68 kilometres (42 mi) away from Chandigarh University, 45 kilometres (28 mi) from Indian Institute of Technology and 61 kilometres (38 mi) away from Lovely Professional University.

== Transport ==
Nawanshahr train station is the nearest train station however, Garhshankar Junction railway station is 27 kilometres (17 mi) away from the village. Sahnewal Airport is the nearest domestic airport which located 49 kilometres (30 mi) away in Ludhiana and the nearest international airport is located in Chandigarh also Sri Guru Ram Dass Jee International Airport is the second nearest airport which is 171 kilometres (106 mi) away in Amritsar.

== See also ==
- List of villages in India
