= Ghataron =

- Village
- Location in Punjab, India Ghataron (India)
- Coordinates: 31.104531°N 75.9979071°E
- Country: India
- State: Punjab
- District: Shaheed Bhagat Singh Nagar

Government
  - Type: Panchayat raj
  - Body: Gram panchayat
- Elevation: 355 m (1,165 ft)

Population (2011)
  - Total: 1,618
- Sex ratio 829/789 ♂/♀

Languages
  - Official: Punjabi
- Time zone: UTC+5:30 (IST)
- PIN: 144421
- Telephone code: 01823
- ISO 3166 code: IN-PB
- Post office: Sahlon
- Website: nawanshahr.nic.in

Ghataron is a village in Shaheed Bhagat Singh Nagar district of Punjab State, India. It is located 3.7 kilometres (2.3 mi) away from postal head office Sahlon, 5.1 kilometres (3.2 mi) from Nawanshahr, 5.8 kilometres (3.6 mi) from district headquarter Shaheed Bhagat Singh Nagar and 96 kilometres (60 mi) from state capital Chandigarh. The village is administrated by Sarpanch an elected representative of the village.

== Demography ==
As of 2011, Ghataron has a total number of 348 houses and population of 1618 of which 829 include are males while 789 are females according to the report published by Census India in 2011. The literacy rate of Ghataron is 86.03%, higher than the state average of 75.84%. The population of children under the age of 6 years is 136 which is 8.41% of total population of Ghataron, and child sex ratio is approximately 915 as compared to Punjab state average of 846.

Most of the people are from Schedule Caste which constitutes 55.87% of total population in Ghataron. The town does not have any Schedule Tribe population so far.

As per the report published by Census India in 2011, 570 people were engaged in work activities out of the total population of Ghataron which includes 435 males and 135 females. According to census survey report 2011, 85.09% workers describe their work as main work and 14.91% workers are involved in Marginal activity providing livelihood for less than 6 months.

== Education ==
KC Engineering College and Doaba Khalsa Trust Group Of Institutions are the nearest colleges.< Industrial Training Institute for women (ITI Nawanshahr) is 7.5 kilometres (4.7 mi) and Lovely Professional University is 45 kilometres (28 mi) away from the village.

== Transport ==
Nawanshahr railway station is the nearest train station however, Garhshankar Junction railway station is 18 kilometres (11 mi) away from the village. Sahnewal Airport is the nearest domestic airport which located 55 kilometres (34 mi) away in Ludhiana and the nearest international airport is located in Chandigarh also Sri Guru Ram Dass Jee International Airport is the second nearest airport which is 154 kilometres (96 mi) away in Amritsar.

== See also ==
- List of villages in India
