= Surapur, SBS Nagar =

Surapur
- Village
- Location in Punjab, India Surapur (India)
- Coordinates: 31.2039160°N 76.0797050°E
- Country: India
- State: Punjab
- District: Shaheed Bhagat Singh Nagar

Government
  - Type: Panchayat raj
  - Body: Gram panchayat
- Elevation: 251 m (823 ft)

Population (2011)
  - Total: 1,629
- Sex ratio 769/860 ♂/♀

Languages
  - Official: Punjabi
- Time zone: UTC+5:30 (IST)
- PIN: 144506
- Telephone code: 01884
- ISO 3166 code: IN-PB
- Post office: Mahil Gailan (S.O)
- Website: nawanshahr.nic.in

Surapur is a village in Shaheed Bhagat Singh Nagar district of Punjab State, India. It is located 3.6 kilometres (2.2 mi) away from sub post office Mahil Gailan, 11.8 kilometres (7.3 mi) from Nawanshahr, 18.8 kilometres (11.7 mi) from district headquarter Shaheed Bhagat Singh Nagar and 105 kilometres (65 mi) from state capital Chandigarh. The village is administrated by Sarpanch an elected representative of the village.

== Demography ==
As of 2011, Surapur has a total number of 355 houses and population of 1629 of which 769 include are males while 860 are females according to the report published by Census India in 2011. The literacy rate of Surapur is 78.94% higher than the state average of 75.84%. The population of children under the age of 6 years is 133 which is 8.16% of total population of Surapur, and child sex ratio is approximately 1180 as compared to Punjab state average of 846.

The population consist of obc which constitutes 100% of total population in Surapur. The town does not have any Schedule Tribe population so far.

As per the report published by Census India in 2011, 502 people were engaged in work activities out of the total population of Surapur which includes 465 males and 37 females. According to census survey report 2011, 80.08% workers describe their work as main work and 19.92% workers are involved in Marginal activity providing livelihood for less than 6 months.

== Education ==
The village has a Punjabi medium, co-ed upper primary with secondary school established in 1965. The school provide mid-day meal per Indian Midday Meal Scheme. As per Right of Children to Free and Compulsory Education Act the school provide free education to children between the ages of 6 and 14.

Amardeep Singh Shergill Memorial college Mukandpur are the nearest colleges. Industrial Training Institute for women (ITI Nawanshahr) is 12 kilometres (7.5 mi). The village is 86 kilometres (53 mi) away from Chandigarh University, 62 kilometres (39 mi) from Indian Institute of Technology and 41 kilometres (25 mi) away from Lovely Professional University.

== Transport ==
Nawanshahr train station is the nearest train station however, Garhshankar Junction railway station is 10 kilometres (6.2 mi) away from the village. Sahnewal Airport is the nearest domestic airport which located 67 kilometres (42 mi) away in Ludhiana and the nearest international airport is located in Chandigarh also Sri Guru Ram Dass Jee International Airport is the second nearest airport which is 150 kilometres (93 mi) away in Amritsar.

== See also ==
- List of villages in India
