= Garhi Ajit Singh =

- Village
- Location in Punjab, India Garhi Ajit Singh (India)
- Coordinates: 31.0710853°N 75.9715298°E
- Country: India
- State: Punjab
- District: Shaheed Bhagat Singh Nagar

Government
  - Type: Panchayat raj
  - Body: Gram panchayat
- Elevation: 254 m (833 ft)

Population (2011)
  - Total: 1,641
- Sex ratio 813/828 ♂/♀

Languages
  - Official: Punjabi
- Time zone: UTC+5:30 (IST)
- PIN: 144517
- Telephone code: 01823
- ISO 3166 code: IN-PB
- Post office: Aur
- Website: nawanshahr.nic.in

Garhi Ajit Singh is a village in Shaheed Bhagat Singh Nagar district of Punjab State, India. It is located 5.2 kilometres (3.2 mi) away from postal head office Aur, 17 kilometres (11 mi) from Nawanshahr, 8.4 kilometres (5.2 mi) from district headquarter Shaheed Bhagat Singh Nagar and 106 kilometres (66 mi) from state capital Chandigarh. The village is administrated by Sarpanch an elected representative of the village.

== Demography ==
As of 2011, Garhi Ajit Singh has a total number of 351 houses and population of 1641 of which 813 include are males while 823 are females according to the report published by Census India in 2011. The literacy rate of Garhi Ajit Singh is 79.30%, higher than the state average of 75.84%. The population of children under the age of 6 years is 187 which is 11.40% of total population of Garhi Ajit Singh, and child sex ratio is approximately 968 as compared to Punjab state average of 846.

Most of the people are from Schedule Caste which constitutes 49.18% of total population in Garhi Ajit Singh. The town does not have any Schedule Tribe population so far.

As per the report published by Census India in 2011, 430 people were engaged in work activities out of the total population of Garhi Ajit Singh which includes 410 males and 20 females. According to census survey report 2011, 59.07% workers describe their work as main work and 40.93% workers are involved in Marginal activity providing livelihood for less than 6 months.

== Education ==
The village has a Punjabi medium, co-ed primary school founded in 1954. The schools does not provide mid-day meal. The school provide free education to children between the ages of 6 and 14 as per Right of Children to Free and Compulsory Education Act. KC Engineering College and Doaba Khalsa Trust Group Of Institutions are the nearest colleges. Industrial Training Institute for women (ITI Nawanshahr) is 20 kilometres (12 mi) and Lovely Professional University is 38 kilometres (24 mi) away from the village.

== Transport ==
Nawanshahr railway station is the nearest train station however, Garhshankar Junction railway station is 33 kilometres (21 mi) away from the village. Sahnewal Airport is the nearest domestic airport which located 51 kilometres (32 mi) away in Ludhiana and the nearest international airport is located in Chandigarh also Sri Guru Ram Dass Jee International Airport is the second nearest airport which is 146 kilometres (91 mi) away in Amritsar.

== See also ==
- List of villages in India
