= Nangal Chhanga =

- Village
- Location in Punjab, India Nangal Chhanga (India)
- Coordinates: 31.0201697°N 76.1631453°E
- Country: India
- State: Punjab
- District: Shaheed Bhagat Singh Nagar

Government
  - Type: Panchayat raj
  - Body: Gram panchayat
- Elevation: 355 m (1,165 ft)

Population (2011)
  - Total: 413
- Sex ratio 202/211 ♂/♀

Languages
  - Official: Punjabi
- Time zone: UTC+5:30 (IST)
- PIN: 144517
- Telephone code: 01823
- ISO 3166 code: IN-PB
- Post office: Bahloor Kalan (B.O)
- Website: nawanshahr.nic.in

Nangal Chhanga is a village in Shaheed Bhagat Singh Nagar district of Punjab State, India. It is located 1.4 kilometres (0.87 mi) away from branch post office Bahloor Kalan, 16.8 kilometres (10.4 mi) from Nawanshahr, 18 kilometres (11 mi) from district headquarter Shaheed Bhagat Singh Nagar and 87 kilometres (54 mi) from state capital Chandigarh. The village is administrated by Sarpanch an elected representative of the village.

== Demography ==
As of 2011, Nangal Chhanga has a total number of 74 houses and population of 413 of which 202 include are males while 211 are females according to the report published by Census India in 2011. The literacy rate of Nangal Chhanga is 83.71% lower than the state average of 75.84%. The population of children under the age of 6 years is 57 which is 13.80% of total population of Nangal Chhanga, and child sex ratio is approximately 900 as compared to Punjab state average of 846.

Most of the people are from Schedule Caste which constitutes 68.52% of total population in Nangal Chhanga. The town does not have any Schedule Tribe population so far.

As per the report published by Census India in 2011, 130 people were engaged in work activities out of the total population of Nangal Chhanga which includes 112 males and 18 females. According to census survey report 2011, 80% workers describe their work as main work and 20% workers are involved in Marginal activity providing livelihood for less than 6 months.

== Education ==
The village has a Punjabi medium, co-ed primary school established in 1978. The school provide mid-day meal as per Indian Midday Meal Scheme. As per Right of Children to Free and Compulsory Education Act the school provide free education to children between the ages of 6 and 14.

KC Engineering College and Doaba Khalsa Trust Group Of Institutions are the nearest colleges. Industrial Training Institute for women (ITI Nawanshahr) is 16 kilometres (9.9 mi). The village is 64 kilometres (40 mi) away from Chandigarh University, 50 kilometres (31 mi) from Indian Institute of Technology and 60 kilometres (37 mi) away from Lovely Professional University.

== Transport ==
Nawanshahr train station is the nearest train station however, Garhshankar Junction railway station is 28 kilometres (17 mi) away from the village. Sahnewal Airport is the nearest domestic airport which located 45 kilometres (28 mi) away in Ludhiana and the nearest international airport is located in Chandigarh also Sri Guru Ram Dass Jee International Airport is the second nearest airport which is 169 kilometres (105 mi) away in Amritsar.

== See also ==
- List of villages in India
