= Nangal Jattan =

- Village
- Location in Punjab, India Nangal Jattan (India)
- Coordinates: 31.0306699°N 75.9478534°E
- Country: India
- State: Punjab
- District: Shaheed Bhagat Singh Nagar

Government
  - Type: Panchayat raj
  - Body: Gram panchayat
- Elevation: 254 m (833 ft)

Population (2011)
  - Total: 504
- Sex ratio 241/263 ♂/♀

Languages
  - Official: Punjabi
- Time zone: UTC+5:30 (IST)
- PIN: 144415
- Telephone code: 01823
- ISO 3166 code: IN-PB
- Post office: Lassara (S.O)
- Website: nawanshahr.nic.in

Nangal Jattan is a village in Shaheed Bhagat Singh Nagar district of Punjab State, India. It is located 2.6 kilometres (1.6 mi) away from sub post office Lassara, 20 kilometres (12 mi) from Nawanshahr, 13 kilometres (8.1 mi) from district headquarter Shaheed Bhagat Singh Nagar and 109 kilometres (68 mi) from state capital Chandigarh. The village is administrated by Sarpanch an elected representative of the village.

== Demography ==
As of 2011, Nangal Jattan has a total number of 103 houses and population of 504 of which 241 include are males while 263 are females according to the report published by Census India in 2011. The literacy rate of Nangal Jattan is 81.68% higher than the state average of 75.84%. The population of children under the age of 6 years is 51 which is 10.12% of total population of Nangal Jattan, and child sex ratio is approximately 1125 as compared to Punjab state average of 846.

Most of the people are from Schedule Caste which constitutes 41.07% of total population in Nangal Jattan. The town does not have any Schedule Tribe population so far.

As per the report published by Census India in 2011, 149 people were engaged in work activities out of the total population of Nangal Jattan which includes 130 males and 19 females. According to census survey report 2011, 42.95% workers describe their work as main work and 57.05% workers are involved in Marginal activity providing livelihood for less than 6 months.

== Education ==
The village has a Punjabi medium, co-ed primary school established in 1972. The school provide mid-day meal as per Indian Midday Meal Scheme. As per Right of Children to Free and Compulsory Education Act the school provide free education to children between the ages of 6 and 14.

KC Engineering College and Doaba Khalsa Trust Group Of Institutions are the nearest colleges. Industrial Training Institute for women (ITI Nawanshahr) is 22 kilometres (14 mi). The village is 87 kilometres (54 mi) away from Chandigarh University, 62 kilometres (39 mi) from Indian Institute of Technology and 50 kilometres (31 mi) away from Lovely Professional University.

== Transport ==
Phillaur train station is the nearest train station however, Ludhiana Junction railway station is 34 kilometres (21 mi) away from the village. Sahnewal Airport is the nearest domestic airport which located 47 kilometres (29 mi) away in Ludhiana and the nearest international airport is located in Chandigarh also Sri Guru Ram Dass Jee International Airport is the second nearest airport which is 159 kilometres (99 mi) away in Amritsar.

== See also ==
- List of villages in India
