= Bahua =

- Village
- Location in Punjab, India Bahua (India)
- Coordinates: 31.2122509°N 75.8218646°E
- Country: India
- State: Punjab
- District: Shaheed Bhagat Singh Nagar

Government
  - Type: Panchayat raj
  - Body: Gram panchayat
- Elevation: 254 m (833 ft)

Population (2011)
  - Total: 924
- Sex ratio 487/434 ♂/♀

Languages
  - Official: Punjabi
- Time zone: UTC+5:30 (IST)
- PIN: 144504
- Telephone code: 01884
- ISO 3166 code: IN-PB
- Post office: Behram
- Website: nawanshahr.nic.in

Bahua is a village in Shaheed Bhagat Singh Nagar district of Punjab State, India. It is located 6.9 kilometres (4.3 mi) away from postal head office Behram, 6.4 kilometres (4.0 mi) from Phagwara, 31 kilometres (19 mi) from district headquarter Shaheed Bhagat Singh Nagar and 121 kilometres (75 mi) from state capital Chandigarh. The village is administrated by Sarpanch an elected representative of the village.

== Demography ==
As of 2011, Bahua has a total number of 192 houses and population of 924, out of which 487 are males while 437 are females, according to the report published by Census India in 2011. The literacy rate of Bahua is 81.84%, higher than the state average of 75.84%. The population of children under the age of 6 years is 65 which is 7.03% of total population of Bahua, and child sex ratio is approximately 667 as compared to Punjab state average of 846.

Most of the people are from Schedule Caste which constitutes 55.63% of total population in Bahua. The town does not have any Schedule Tribe population so far.

As per the report published by Census India in 2011, 515 people were engaged in work activities out of the total population of Bahua which includes 308 males and 207 females. According to census survey report 2011, 92.23% workers describe their work as main work and 7.77% workers are involved in Marginal activity providing livelihood for less than 6 months.

== Education ==
The village has a Punjabi medium, co-ed primary school founded in 1955. The schools provide mid-day meal as per Indian Midday Meal Scheme. The school provides free education to children between the ages of 6 and 14 as per Right of Children to Free and Compulsory Education Act.

Amardeep Singh Shergill Memorial college Mukandpur and Sikh National College Banga are the nearest colleges. Lovely Professional University is 15 kilometres (9.3 mi) away from the village.

== Transport ==
Kulthamabdullashah Halt railway station is the nearest train station however, Phagwara Junction railway station is 6.9 kilometres (4.3 mi) away from the village. Sahnewal Airport is the nearest domestic airport which located 56 kilometres (35 mi) away in Ludhiana and the nearest international airport is located in Chandigarh also Sri Guru Ram Dass Jee International Airport is the second nearest airport which is 123 kilometres (76 mi) away in Amritsar.

== See also ==
- List of villages in India
