= Salempur, SBS Nagar =

Salempur
- Village
- Location in Punjab, India Salempur (India)
- Coordinates: 31.0290934°N 76.1694494°E
- Country: India
- State: Punjab
- District: Shaheed Bhagat Singh Nagar

Government
  - Type: Panchayat raj
  - Body: Gram panchayat
- Elevation: 355 m (1,165 ft)

Population (2011)
  - Total: 539
- Sex ratio 256/283 ♂/♀

Languages
  - Official: Punjabi
- Time zone: UTC+5:30 (IST)
- PIN: 144517
- Telephone code: 01884
- ISO 3166 code: IN-PB
- Post office: Bahloor Kalan (B.O)
- Website: nawanshahr.nic.in

Salempur is a village in Shaheed Bhagat Singh Nagar district of Punjab State, India. It is located 2 kilometres (1.2 mi) away from branch post office Bahloor Kalan, 16 kilometres (9.9 mi) from Nawanshahr, 17 kilometres (11 mi) from district headquarter Shaheed Bhagat Singh Nagar and 85 kilometres (53 mi) from state capital Chandigarh. The village is administrated by Sarpanch an elected representative of the village.

== Demography ==
As of 2011, Salempur has a total number of 97 houses and population of 539 of which 256 include are males while 283 are females according to the report published by Census India in 2011. The literacy rate of Salempur is 80.70% higher than the state average of 75.84%. The population of children under the age of 6 years is 52 which is 9.65% of total population of Salempur, and child sex ratio is approximately 733 as compared to Punjab state average of 846.

Most of the people are from Schedule Caste which constitutes 72.36% of total population in Salempur. The town does not have any Schedule Tribe population so far.

As per the report published by Census India in 2011, 254 people were engaged in work activities out of the total population of Salempur which includes 121 males and 133 females. According to census survey report 2011, 37.40% workers describe their work as main work and 62.60% workers are involved in Marginal activity providing livelihood for less than 6 months.

== Education ==
The village has a Punjabi medium, co-ed primary school established in 1973. The school provide mid-day meal per Indian Midday Meal Scheme. As per Right of Children to Free and Compulsory Education Act the school provide free education to children between the ages of 6 and 14.

KC Engineering College and Doaba Khalsa Trust Group Of Institutions are the nearest colleges. Industrial Training Institute for women (ITI Nawanshahr) is 16 kilometres (9.9 mi). The village is 64 kilometres (40 mi) away from Chandigarh University, 51 kilometres (32 mi) from Indian Institute of Technology and 59 kilometres (37 mi) away from Lovely Professional University.

== Transport ==
Banga train station is the nearest train station however, Phagwara Junction railway station is 27 kilometres (17 mi) away from the village. Sahnewal Airport is the nearest domestic airport which located 46 kilometres (29 mi) away in Ludhiana and the nearest international airport is located in Chandigarh also Sri Guru Ram Dass Jee International Airport is the second nearest airport which is 169 kilometres (105 mi) away in Amritsar.

== See also ==
- List of villages in India
