= Muna, SBS Nagar =

Muna
- Village
- Location in Punjab, India Muna (India)
- Coordinates: 31.2216373°N 75.8598876°E
- Country: India
- State: Punjab
- District: Shaheed Bhagat Singh Nagar

Government
  - Type: Panchayat raj
  - Body: Gram panchayat
- Elevation: 251 m (823 ft)

Population (2011)
  - Total: 776
- Sex ratio 397/379 ♂/♀

Languages
  - Official: Punjabi
- Time zone: UTC+5:30 (IST)
- PIN: 144501
- Telephone code: 01823
- ISO 3166 code: IN-PB
- Post office: Kultham (S.O)
- Website: nawanshahr.nic.in

Muna is a village in Shaheed Bhagat Singh Nagar district of Punjab State, India. It is located 4 kilometres (2.5 mi) away from sub post office Kultham, 29 kilometres (18 mi) from Nawanshahr, 27 kilometres (17 mi) from district headquarter Shaheed Bhagat Singh Nagar and 119 kilometres (74 mi) from state capital Chandigarh. The village is administrated by Sarpanch an elected representative of the village.

== Demography ==
As of 2011, Muna has a total number of 161 houses and population of 776 of which 397 include are males while 379 are females according to the report published by Census India in 2011. The literacy rate of Muna is 84.38% higher than the state average of 75.84%. The population of children under the age of 6 years is 72 which is 9.28% of total population of Muna, and child sex ratio is approximately 714 as compared to Punjab state average of 846.

Most of the people are from Schedule Caste which constitutes 82.47% of total population in Muna. The town does not have any Schedule Tribe population so far.

As per the report published by Census India in 2011, 207 people were engaged in work activities out of the total population of Muna which includes 192 males and 15 females. According to census survey report 2011, 96.14% workers describe their work as main work and 3.86% workers are involved in Marginal activity providing livelihood for less than 6 months.

== Education ==
The village has a Punjabi medium, co-ed primary school established in 1954. The school provide mid-day meal as per Indian Midday Meal Scheme. As per Right of Children to Free and Compulsory Education Act the school provide free education to children between the ages of 6 and 14.

Amardeep Singh Shergill Memorial college Mukandpur and Doaba Khalsa Trust Group Of Institutions are the nearest colleges. Industrial Training Institute for women (ITI Nawanshahr) is 30 kilometres (19 mi). The village is 76 kilometres (47 mi) from Indian Institute of Technology and 20 kilometres (12 mi) away from Lovely Professional University.

List of schools nearby:

- Govt Senior Secondary School, Ladhana Jhikka
- Dashmesh Model School, Kahma
- Govt High School, Jhander Kalan
- Govt Gigh School, Khan Khana
- Guru Ram Dass Public School, Cheta

== Transport ==
Banga train station is the nearest train station however, Phagwara Junction railway station is 12 kilometres (7.5 mi) away from the village. Sahnewal Airport is the nearest domestic airport which located 61 kilometres (38 mi) away in Ludhiana and the nearest international airport is located in Chandigarh also Sri Guru Ram Dass Jee International Airport is the second nearest airport which is 128 kilometres (80 mi) away in Amritsar.

== See also ==
- List of villages in India
