= Jagatpur Theh =

- Village
- Location in Punjab, India Jagatpur Theh (India)
- Coordinates: 31.2149151°N 75.8489331°E
- Country: India
- State: Punjab
- District: Shaheed Bhagat Singh Nagar

Government
  - Type: Panchayat raj
  - Body: Gram panchayat
- Elevation: 251 m (823 ft)

Population (2011)
  - Total: 28
- Sex ratio 12/16 ♂/♀

Languages
  - Official: Punjabi
- Time zone: UTC+5:30 (IST)
- PIN: 144501
- Telephone code: 01884
- ISO 3166 code: IN-PB
- Post office: Kultham
- Website: nawanshahr.nic.in

Jagatpur Theh is a village in Shaheed Bhagat Singh Nagar district of Punjab State, India. It is located 15 kilometres (9.3 mi) away from Banga, 10 kilometres (6.2 mi) from Phagwara, 26 kilometres (16 mi) from district headquarter Shaheed Bhagat Singh Nagar and 119 kilometres (74 mi) from state capital Chandigarh. The village is administrated by Sarpanch an elected representative of the village.

== Demography ==
As of 2011, Jagatpur Theh has a total number of 6 houses and population of 28 of which 12 include are males while 16 are females according to the report published by Census India in 2011. The literacy rate of Jagatpur Theh is 77.78%, higher than the state average of 75.84%. The population of children under the age of 6 years is 1 which is 3.57% of total population of Jagatpur Theh, and child sex ratio is approximately 0 as compared to Punjab state average of 846.

As per the report published by Census India in 2011, 10 people were engaged in work activities out of the total population of Jagatpur Theh which includes 8 males and 2 females. According to census survey report 2011, 100% workers describe their work as main work and 0% workers are involved in Marginal activity providing livelihood for less than 6 months.

== Education ==
Amardeep Singh Shergill Memorial college Mukandpur, Sikh National College Banga and Guru Nanak College of Nursing in Dhahan are the nearest colleges. Lovely Professional University is 18.5 kilometres (11.5 mi) away from the village.

== Transport ==
Banga railway station is the nearest train station however, Phagwara Junction railway station is 10 kilometres (6.2 mi) away from the village. Sahnewal Airport is the nearest domestic airport which located 60 kilometres (37 mi) away in Ludhiana and the nearest international airport is located in Chandigarh also Sri Guru Ram Dass Jee International Airport is the second nearest airport which is 127 kilometres (79 mi) away in Amritsar.

== See also ==
- List of villages in India
