= Sujjon =

- Village
- Location in Punjab, India Sujjon (India)
- Coordinates: 31.2141879°N 76.0710233°E
- Country: India
- State: Punjab
- District: Shaheed Bhagat Singh Nagar

Government
  - Type: Panchayat raj
  - Body: Gram panchayat
- Elevation: 251 m (823 ft)

Population (2011)
  - Total: 1,661
- Sex ratio 805/856 ♂/♀

Languages
  - Official: Punjabi
- Time zone: UTC+5:30 (IST)
- PIN: 144506
- Telephone code: 01823
- ISO 3166 code: IN-PB
- Post office: Mahil Gailan (S.O)
- Website: nawanshahr.nic.in

Sujjon is a village in Shaheed Bhagat Singh Nagar district of Punjab State, India. It is located 3.5 kilometres (2.2 mi) away from sub post office Mahil Gailan, 13 kilometres (8.1 mi) from Nawanshahr, 18.6 kilometres (11.6 mi) from district headquarter Shaheed Bhagat Singh Nagar and 106 kilometres (66 mi) from state capital Chandigarh. The village is administrated by Sarpanch an elected representative of the village.

== Demography ==
As of 2011, Sujjon has a total number of 387 houses and population of 1661 of which 805 include are males while 856 are females according to the report published by Census India in 2011. The literacy rate of Sujjon is 81.47% higher than the state average of 75.84%. The population of children under the age of 6 years is 150 which is 9.03% of total population of Sujjon, and child sex ratio is approximately 807 as compared to Punjab state average of 846.

Most of the people are from saini or Shoorsaini caste which is 80% of population. Schedule Caste which constitutes 19.63% of total population in Sujjon. The town does not have any Schedule Tribe population so far.

As per the report published by Census India in 2011, 484 people were engaged in work activities out of the total population of Sujjon which includes 400 males and 84 females. According to census survey report 2011, 84.30% workers describe their work as main work and 15.70% workers are involved in Marginal activity providing livelihood for less than 6 months.

== Education ==
The village has a Punjabi medium, co-ed upper primary school established in 1995. The school provide mid-day meal per Indian Midday Meal Scheme. As per Right of Children to Free and Compulsory Education Act, the school provide free education to children between the ages of 6 and 14.

Amardeep Singh Shergill Memorial college Mukandpur, KC Engineering College and Doaba Khalsa Trust Group Of Institutions are the nearest colleges. Industrial Training Institute for women (ITI Nawanshahr) is 14 kilometres (8.7 mi). The village is 87 kilometres (54 mi) away from Chandigarh University, 64 kilometres (40 mi) from Indian Institute of Technology and 40 kilometres (25 mi) away from Lovely Professional University.

== Transport ==
Nawanshahr train station is the nearest train station however, Garhshankar Junction railway station is 11.8 kilometres (7.3 mi) away from the village. Sahnewal Airport is the nearest domestic airport which located 68 kilometres (42 mi) away in Ludhiana and the nearest international airport is located in Chandigarh also Sri Guru Ram Dass Jee International Airport is the second nearest airport which is 149 kilometres (93 mi) away in Amritsar.

== See also ==
- List of villages in India
