= Gorakhpur, SBS Nagar =

Gorakhpur
- Village
- Location in Punjab, India Gorakhpur (India)
- Coordinates: 31.098815°N 76.1528867°E
- Country: India
- State: Punjab
- District: Shaheed Bhagat Singh Nagar

Government
  - Type: Panchayat raj
  - Body: Gram panchayat
- Elevation: 355 m (1,165 ft)

Population (2011)
  - Total: 1,085
- Sex ratio 556/529 ♂/♀

Languages
  - Official: Punjabi
- Time zone: UTC+5:30 (IST)
- PIN: 144516
- Telephone code: 01823
- ISO 3166 code: IN-PB
- Post office: Langroya
- Website: nawanshahr.nic.in

Gorakhpur is a village in Shaheed Bhagat Singh Nagar district of Punjab State, India. It is located 1.8 kilometres (1.1 mi) away from postal head office Langroya, 6 kilometres (3.7 mi) from Nawanshahr, 12.7 kilometres (7.9 mi) from district headquarter Shaheed Bhagat Singh Nagar and 87 kilometres (54 mi) from state capital Chandigarh. The village is administrated by Sarpanch an elected representative of the village.

== Demography ==
As of 2011, Gorakhpur has a total number of 229 houses and population of 1085 of which 556 include are males while 529 are females according to the report published by Census India in 2011. The literacy rate of Gorakhpur is 81.87%, higher than the state average of 75.84%. The population of children under the age of 6 years is 120 which is 11.06% of total population of Gorakhpur, and child sex ratio is approximately 765 as compared to Punjab state average of 846.

Most of the people are from Schedule Caste which constitutes 2.03% of total population in Gorakhpur. The town does not have any Schedule Tribe population so far.

As per the report published by Census India in 2011, 295 people were engaged in work activities out of the total population of Gorakhpur which includes 269 males and 26 females. According to census survey report 2011, 97.63% workers describe their work as main work and 2.37% workers are involved in Marginal activity providing livelihood for less than 6 months.

== Education ==
The village has a Punjabi medium, co-ed primary school. The schools does not provide mid-day meal. The school provide free education to children between the ages of 6 and 14 as per Right of Children to Free and Compulsory Education Act. KC Engineering College and Doaba Khalsa Trust Group Of Institutions are the nearest colleges. Industrial Training Institute for women (ITI Nawanshahr) is 4 kilometres (2.5 mi) and Lovely Professional University is 50 kilometres (31 mi) away from the village.

== Transport ==
Banga railway station is the nearest train station however, Phagwara Junction railway station is 17 kilometres (11 mi) away from the village. Sahnewal Airport is the nearest domestic airport which located 57 kilometres (35 mi) away in Ludhiana and the nearest international airport is located in Chandigarh also Sri Guru Ram Dass Jee International Airport is the second nearest airport which is 158 kilometres (98 mi) away in Amritsar.

== See also ==
- List of villages in India
