= Jabbowal, SBS Nagar =

Jabbowal
- Village
- Location in Punjab, India Jabbowal (India)
- Coordinates: 31.1668658°N 76.0767965°E
- Country: India
- State: Punjab
- District: Shaheed Bhagat Singh Nagar

Government
  - Type: Panchayat raj
  - Body: Gram panchayat
- Elevation: 355 m (1,165 ft)

Population (2011)
  - Total: 1,914
- Sex ratio 984/930 ♂/♀

Languages
  - Official: Punjabi
- Time zone: UTC+5:30 (IST)
- PIN: 144512
- Telephone code: 01823
- ISO 3166 code: IN-PB
- Post office: Kahma
- Website: nawanshahr.nic.in

Jabbowal is a village in Shaheed Bhagat Singh Nagar district of Punjab State, India. It is located 4 kilometres (2.5 mi) away from postal head office Kahma, 8.2 kilometres (5.1 mi) from Nawanshahr, 7 kilometres (4.3 mi) from district headquarter Shaheed Bhagat Singh Nagar and 97 kilometres (60 mi) from state capital Chandigarh. The village is administrated by Sarpanch an elected representative of the village.

== Demography ==
As of 2011, Jabbowal has a total number of 384 houses and population of 1914 of which 984 include are males while 930 are females according to the report published by Census India in 2011. The literacy rate of Jabbowal is 75.86%, higher than the state average of 75.84%. The population of children under the age of 6 years is 174 which is 9.09% of total population of Jabbowal, and child sex ratio is approximately 977 as compared to Punjab state average of 846.

Most of the people are from Schedule Caste which constitutes 44.93% of total population in Jabbowal. The town does not have any Schedule Tribe population so far.

As per the report published by Census India in 2011, 575 people were engaged in work activities out of the total population of Jabbowal which includes 529 males and 46 females. According to census survey report 2011, 94.96% workers describe their work as main work and 5.04% workers are involved in Marginal activity providing livelihood for less than 6 months.

== Education ==
The village has a Punjabi medium, co-ed upper primary school founded in 1975. The school provide mid-day mealas per Indian Midday Meal Scheme. The school provide free education to children between the ages of 6 and 14 as per Right of Children to Free and Compulsory Education Act.

Guru Nanak College of Nursing, Amardeep Singh Shergill Memorial college Mukandpur and Sikh National College Banga are the nearest colleges. and Lovely Professional University is 40 kilometres (25 mi) away from the village.

== Transport ==
Nawanshahr railway station is the nearest train station however, Garhshankar Junction railway station is 11 kilometres (6.8 mi) away from the village. Sahnewal Airport is the nearest domestic airport which located 63 kilometres (39 mi) away in Ludhiana and the nearest international airport is located in Chandigarh also Sri Guru Ram Dass Jee International Airport is the second nearest airport which is 148 kilometres (92 mi) away in Amritsar.

== See also ==
- List of villages in India
