= Chak Mander =

- Village
- Location in Punjab, India Chak Mander (India)
- Coordinates: 31.2073692°N 75.852608°E
- Country: India
- State: Punjab
- District: Shaheed Bhagat Singh Nagar

Government
  - Type: Panchayat raj
  - Body: Gram panchayat
- Elevation: 251 m (823 ft)

Population (2011)
  - Total: 859
- Sex ratio 428/431 ♂/♀

Languages
  - Official: Punjabi
- Time zone: UTC+5:30 (IST)
- PIN: 144501
- Telephone code: 01884
- ISO 3166 code: IN-PB
- Post office: Kultham
- Website: nawanshahr.nic.in

Chak Mander is a village in Shaheed Bhagat Singh Nagar district of Punjab State, India. It is located 1.9 kilometres (1.2 mi) away from postal head office Kultham, 14 kilometres (8.7 mi) from Banga, 28 kilometres (17 mi) from the district headquarters Shaheed Bhagat Singh Nagar and 118 kilometres (73 mi) from the state capital Chandigarh. The village is administrated by Sarpanch, an elected representative of the village.

== Demography ==
In 2011, Chak Mander has 176 houses and a population of 859 (428 include and 431 females) according to the report published by the 2011 Census of India. The literacy rate was 82.79%, higher than the state average of 75.84%. There were 86 children under the age of 6 years (10.01% of the population) and the child sex ratio was approximately 921, compared to the Punjab state average of 846.

Most of the people weare from schedule castes which constitute 68.80% of the population. The village did not have any schedule tribe population.

According to Census India in 2011, 265 people were engaged in work activities (239 males and 26 females). 95.85% of workers described their work as main work and 4.15% workers were involved in marginal activity providing livelihood for less than six months.

== Education ==
The village has a Punjabi medium, co-educational primary school. It provides mid day meals under the Indian Midday Meal Scheme and the meal is prepared in school premises. In accordance with the Right of Children to Free and Compulsory Education Act, the school provides free education to children between the ages of 6 and 14.

Amardeep Singh Shergill Memorial college Mukandpur and Sikh National College Banga are the nearest colleges. Lovely Professional University is 18 kilometres (11 mi) from the village.

== Transport ==
The nearest train station is Banga railway station. Phagwara Junction railway station is 10 kilometres (6.2 mi) from the village. The nearest domestic airport is Sahnewal Airport, located 59 kilometres (37 mi) away in Ludhiana. The nearest international airport is in Chandigarh, and Sri Guru Ram Dass Jee International Airport is the second nearest airport which is 126 kilometres (78 mi) away in Amritsar.

== See also ==
- List of villages in India
