= Raipur Daba =

Raipur Dabba
- Village
- Location in Punjab, India Raipur Dabba (India)
- Coordinates: 31.1272364°N 75.9974263°E
- Country: India
- State: Punjab
- District: Shaheed Bhagat Singh Nagar

Government
  - Type: Panchayat raj
  - Body: Gram panchayat
- Elevation: 254 m (833 ft)

Population (2011)
  - Total: 1,271
- Sex ratio 631/640 ♂/♀

Languages
  - Official: Punjabi
- Time zone: UTC+5:30 (IST)
- PIN: 144511
- Telephone code: 01823
- ISO 3166 code: IN-PB
- Post office: Dosanjh Khurd (S.O)
- Website: nawanshahr.nic.in

Raipur Daba, also spelled as Raipur Dabba, is a village in Shaheed Bhagat Singh Nagar district of Punjab State, India. It is located 5.6 kilometres (3.5 mi) away from sub post office Dosanjh Khurd, 14 kilometres (8.7 mi) from Nawanshahr, 7 kilometres (4.3 mi) from district headquarter Shaheed Bhagat Singh Nagar and 106 kilometres (66 mi) from state capital Chandigarh. The village is administrated by the arpanch, an elected representative of the village.

== Demography ==
As of 2011, Raipur Daba has a total number of 288 houses and population of 1271 of which 631 include are males while 640 are females according to the report published by Census India in 2011. The literacy rate of Raipur Daba is 81.23% higher than the state average of 75.84%. The population of children under the age of 6 years is 104 which is 8.18% of total population of Raipur Daba, and child sex ratio is approximately 891 as compared to the Punjab State average of 846.

Most of the people are from Schedule Caste which constitutes 51.85% of total population in Raipur Daba. The town does not have any Schedule Tribe population so far.

As per the report published by Census India in 2011, 343 people were engaged in work activities out of the total population of Raipur Daba which includes 318 males and 116 females. According to census survey report 2011, 97.70% workers describe their work as main work and 2.30% workers are involved in Marginal activity providing livelihood for less than 6 months.

== Education ==
The village has a Punjabi medium, co-ed upper primary school established in 1974. The school provide mid-day meal which prepared in school premisesas per Indian Midday Meal Scheme. As per Right of Children to Free and Compulsory Education Act the school provide free education to children between the ages of 6 and 14.

Amardeep Singh Shergill Memorial college Mukandpur, KC Engineering College and Doaba Khalsa Trust Group Of Institutions are the nearest colleges. Industrial Training Institute for women (ITI Nawanshahr) is 17 kilometres (11 mi). The village is 83 kilometres (52 mi) away from Chandigarh University, 63 kilometres (39 mi) from Indian Institute of Technology and 38 kilometres (24 mi) away from Lovely Professional University.

List of schools nearby:

- Govt Senior Secondary School, Ladhana Jhikka
- Dashmesh Model School, Kahma
- Govt High School, Jhander Kalan
- Govt Gigh School, Khan Khana
- Guru Ram Dass Public School, Cheta

== Transport ==
Banga train station is the nearest train station however, Garhshankar Junction railway station is 22 kilometres (14 mi) away from the village. Sahnewal Airport is the nearest domestic airport which located 58 kilometres (36 mi) away in Ludhiana and the nearest international airport is located in Chandigarh also Sri Guru Ram Dass Jee International Airport is the second nearest airport which is 148 kilometres (92 mi) away in Amritsar.

== Fair and festivals ==
The village has a Sikh shrine where a religious fair held annually, which attended by a large number of people of all religions.

== Notable people ==
Bhai Rattan Singh (Raipur Dabba) was a leader of The Ghadar Party was born in Raipur Dabba in 1879.

== See also ==
- List of villages in India
