= Saidpur Kalan =

- Village
- Location in Punjab, India Saidpur Kalan (India)
- Coordinates: 31.0083739°N 76.1348355°E
- Country: India
- State: Punjab
- District: Shaheed Bhagat Singh Nagar

Government
  - Type: Panchayat raj
  - Body: Gram panchayat
- Elevation: 355 m (1,165 ft)

Population (2011)
  - Total: 412
- Sex ratio 220/192 ♂/♀

Languages
  - Official: Punjabi
- Time zone: UTC+5:30 (IST)
- PIN: 144517
- Telephone code: 01823
- ISO 3166 code: IN-PB
- Post office: Bahloor Kalan (B.O)
- Website: nawanshahr.nic.in

Saidpur Kalan is a village in Shaheed Bhagat Singh Nagar district of Punjab State, India. Khurd and Kalan mean small and large respectively, when two villages have the same name they are distinguished by using Kalan or Khurd with the village name. It is located 2.1 kilometres (1.3 mi) away from branch post office Bahloor Kalan, 16.8 kilometres (10.4 mi) from Nawanshahr, 17.7 kilometres (11.0 mi) from district headquarter Shaheed Bhagat Singh Nagar and 84.3 kilometres (52.4 mi) from state capital Chandigarh. The village is administrated by Sarpanch an elected representative of the village.

== Demography ==
As of 2011, Saidpur Kalan has a total number of 77 houses and population of 412 of which 220 include are males while 192 are females according to the report published by Census India in 2011. The literacy rate of Saidpur Kalan is 76.34% higher than the state average of 75.84%. The population of children under the age of 6 years is 57 which is 13.83% of total population of Saidpur Kalan, and child sex ratio is approximately 839 as compared to Punjab state average of 846.

Most of the people are from Schedule Caste which constitutes 37.62% of total population in Saidpur Kalan. The town does not have any Schedule Tribe population so far.

As per the report published by Census India in 2011, 122 people were engaged in work activities out of the total population of Saidpur Kalan which includes 119 males and 3 females. According to census survey report 2011, 98.36% workers describe their work as main work and 1.64% workers are involved in Marginal activity providing livelihood for less than 6 months.

== Education ==
The village has a Punjabi medium, co-ed upper primary with secondary school established in 1974. The school provide mid-day meal per Indian Midday Meal Scheme. As per Right of Children to Free and Compulsory Education Act the school provide free education to children between the ages of 6 and 14.

Amardeep Singh Shergill Memorial college Mukandpur, KC Engineering College and Doaba Khalsa Trust Group Of Institutions are the nearest colleges. Industrial Training Institute for women (ITI Nawanshahr) is 18 kilometres (11 mi). The village is 60 kilometres (37 mi) away from Chandigarh University, 55 kilometres (34 mi) from Indian Institute of Technology and 60.4 kilometres (37.5 mi) away from Lovely Professional University.

== Transport ==
Nawanshahr train station is the nearest train station however, Garhshankar Junction railway station is 28 kilometres (17 mi) away from the village. Sahnewal Airport is the nearest domestic airport which located 42 kilometres (26 mi) away in Ludhiana and the nearest international airport is located in Chandigarh also Sri Guru Ram Dass Jee International Airport is the second nearest airport which is 172 kilometres (107 mi) away in Amritsar.

== See also ==
- List of villages in India
