= Kanaun =

- Village
- Location in Punjab, India Kanaun (India)
- Coordinates: 30.9963688°N 76.1303804°E
- Country: India
- State: Punjab
- District: Shaheed Bhagat Singh Nagar

Government
  - Type: Panchayat raj
  - Body: Gram panchayat

Population (2011)
  - Total: 624
- Sex ratio 337/287 ♂/♀

Languages
  - Official: Punjabi
- Time zone: UTC+5:30 (IST)
- PIN: 144517
- Telephone code: 01823
- ISO 3166 code: IN-PB
- Post office: Rahon
- Website: nawanshahr.nic.in

Kanaun is a village in Shaheed Bhagat Singh Nagar district of Punjab State, India. It is located 6.8 kilometres (4.2 mi) away from postal head office Rahon, 16 kilometres (9.9 mi) from Nawanshahr, 17 kilometres (11 mi) from district headquarter Shaheed Bhagat Singh Nagar and 82 kilometres (51 mi) from state capital Chandigarh. The village is administrated by Sarpanch an elected representative of the village.

== Demography ==
As of 2011, Kanaun has a total number of 122 houses and population of 624 of which 337 include are males while 287 are females according to the report published by Census India in 2011. The literacy rate of Kanaun is 61.83%, lower than the state average of 75.84%. The population of children under the age of 6 years is 121 which is 19.39% of total population of Kanaun, and child sex ratio is approximately 952 as compared to Punjab state average of 846.

Most of the people are from Schedule Caste which constitutes 19.39% of total population in Kanaun. The town does not have any Schedule Tribe population so far.

As per the report published by Census India in 2011, 232 people were engaged in work activities out of the total population of Kanaun which includes 176 males and 56 females. According to census survey report 2011, 95.69% workers describe their work as main work and 4.31% workers are involved in Marginal activity providing livelihood for less than 6 months.

== Education ==
The village has a Punjabi medium, co-ed primary school founded in 2008. The school provide mid-day meal as per Indian Midday Meal Scheme. As per Right of Children to Free and Compulsory Education Act the school provide free education to children between the ages of 6 and 14.

KC Engineering College and Doaba Khalsa Trust Group Of Institutions are the nearest colleges. Industrial Training Institute for women (ITI Nawanshahr) is 17.5 kilometres (10.9 mi). The village is 58 kilometres (36 mi) away from Chandigarh University, 52 kilometres (32 mi) from Indian Institute of Technology and 60 kilometres (37 mi) away from Lovely Professional University.

List of schools nearby:

- Dashmesh Model School, Kahma
- Govt High School, Jhander Kalan
- Govt Primary School, Kahlon
- Guru Ram Dass Public School, Cheta
- Lovely Public School, Pathlawa

== Transport ==
Khatkar Kalan Jhandaji railway station is the nearest train station however, Garhshankar Junction railway station is 28 kilometres (17 mi) away from the village. Sahnewal Airport is the nearest domestic airport which located 40 kilometres (25 mi) away in Ludhiana and the nearest international airport is located in Chandigarh also Sri Guru Ram Dass Jee International Airport is the second nearest airport which is 169 kilometres (105 mi) away in Amritsar.

== See also ==
- List of villages in India
