= Chuharpur, SBS Nagar =

Chuharpur
- Village
- Location in Punjab, India Chuharpur (India)
- Coordinates: 31.1434116°N 76.1399066°E
- Country: India
- State: Punjab
- District: Shaheed Bhagat Singh Nagar

Government
  - Type: Panchayat raj
  - Body: Gram panchayat
- Elevation: 355 m (1,165 ft)

Population (2011)
  - Total: 1,545
- Sex ratio 761/784 ♂/♀

Languages
  - Official: Punjabi
- Time zone: UTC+5:30 (IST)
- PIN: 144514
- Telephone code: 01823
- ISO 3166 code: IN-PB
- Post office: Nawanshahar
- Website: nawanshahr.nic.in

Chuharpur or Hayala is a village in Shaheed Bhagat Singh Nagar district of Punjab State, India. It is located 5.4 kilometres (3.4 mi) away from postal head office Nawanshahar, 11 kilometres (6.8 mi) from Garhshankar, 13 kilometres (8.1 mi) from district headquarter Shaheed Bhagat Singh Nagar and 89 kilometres (55 mi) from state capital Chandigarh. The village is administrated by Sarpanch an elected representative of the village.

== Demography ==
As of 2011, Chuharpur has a total number of 310 houses and population of 1545 of which 761 include are males while 784 are females according to the report published by Census India in 2011. The literacy rate of Chuharpur is 80.48%, higher than the state average of 75.84%. The population of children under the age of 6 years is 182 which is 11.78% of total population of Chuharpur, and child sex ratio is approximately 936 as compared to Punjab state average of 846.

Most of the people are from Schedule Caste which constitutes 48.28% of total population in Chuharpur. The town does not have any Schedule Tribe population so far.

As per the report published by Census India in 2011, 392 people were engaged in work activities out of the total population of Chuharpur which includes 373 males and 19 females. According to census survey report 2011, 79.34% workers describe their work as main work and 20.66% workers are involved in Marginal activity providing livelihood for less than 6 months.

== Education ==
The village has a Punjabi medium, co-ed primary school founded in 1955. The schools provide mid-day meal as per Indian Midday Meal Scheme. The school provide free education to children between the ages of 6 and 14 as per Right of Children to Free and Compulsory Education Act. KC Engineering College and Doaba Khalsa Trust Group Of Institutions are the nearest colleges. Industrial Training Institute for women (ITI Nawanshahr) is 5 kilometres (3.1 mi) and Lovely Professional University is 48 kilometres (30 mi) away from the village.

== Transport ==
Nawanshahr railway station is the nearest train station however, Garhshankar Junction railway station is 12 kilometres (7.5 mi) away from the village. Sahnewal Airport is the nearest domestic airport which located 60 kilometres (37 mi) away in Ludhiana and the nearest international airport is located in Chandigarh also Sri Guru Ram Dass Jee International Airport is the second nearest airport which is 157 kilometres (98 mi) away in Amritsar.

== See also ==
- List of villages in India
