= Kariam =

- Village
- Location in Punjab, India Kariam (India)
- Coordinates: 31.1074971°N 76.0771091°E
- Country: India
- State: Punjab
- District: Shaheed Bhagat Singh Nagar

Government
  - Type: Panchayat raj
  - Body: Gram panchayat
- Elevation: 355 m (1,165 ft)

Population (2011)
  - Total: 3,053
- Sex ratio 1582/1471 ♂/♀

Languages
  - Official: Punjabi
- Time zone: UTC+5:30 (IST)
- PIN: 144514
- Telephone code: 01823
- ISO 3166 code: IN-PB
- Post office: Nawanshahar
- Website: nawanshahr.nic.in

Kariam also spelled as Karyam is a village in Shaheed Bhagat Singh Nagar district of Punjab State, India. It is located 3.7 kilometres (2.3 mi) away from postal head office Nawanshahr, 9 kilometres (5.6 mi) from Rahon, 4 kilometres (2.5 mi) from district headquarter Shaheed Bhagat Singh Nagar and 94 kilometres (58 mi) from state capital Chandigarh. The village is administrated by Sarpanch an elected representative of the village.

== Demography ==
As of 2011, Kariam has a total number of 643 houses and population of 3053 of which 1582 include are males while 1471 are females according to the report published by Census India in 2011. The literacy rate of Kariam is 77.33%, higher than the state average of 75.84%. The population of children under the age of 6 years is 265 which is 8.68% of total population of Kariam, and child sex ratio is approximately 815 as compared to Punjab state average of 846.

Most of the people are from Schedule Caste which constitutes 64% of total population in Kariam. The town does not have any Schedule Tribe population so far.

As per the report published by Census India in 2011, 953 people were engaged in work activities out of the total population of Kariam which includes 808 males and 145 females. According to census survey report 2011, 88.35% workers describe their work as main work and 11.65% workers are involved in Marginal activity providing livelihood for less than 6 months.

== Education ==
The village has a Punjabi medium, co-ed upper primary with secondary school established in 1975. The school provide mid-day meal as per Indian Midday Meal Scheme. As per Right of Children to Free and Compulsory Education Act the school provide free education to children between the ages of 6 and 14.

KC Engineering College and Doaba Khalsa Trust Group Of Institutions are the nearest colleges. Industrial Training Institute for women (ITI Nawanshahr) is 6 kilometres (3.7 mi). The village is 74 kilometres (46 mi) away from Chandigarh University, 52 kilometres (32 mi) from Indian Institute of Technology and 44 kilometres (27 mi) away from Lovely Professional University.

== Transport ==
Khatkar Kalan Jhandaji railway station is the nearest train station however, Garhshankar Junction railway station is 16 kilometres (9.9 mi) away from the village. Sahnewal Airport is the nearest domestic airport which located 55.7 kilometres (34.6 mi) away in Ludhiana and the nearest international airport is located in Chandigarh also Sri Guru Ram Dass Jee International Airport is the second nearest airport which is 153 kilometres (95 mi) away in Amritsar.

== See also ==
- List of villages in India
