= Sadhpur =

- Village
- Location in Punjab, India Sadhpur (India)
- Coordinates: 31.1478923°N 75.9279245°E
- Country: India
- State: Punjab
- District: Shaheed Bhagat Singh Nagar

Government
  - Type: Panchayat raj
  - Body: Gram panchayat
- Elevation: 251 m (823 ft)

Population (2011)
  - Total: 938
- Sex ratio 432/506 ♂/♀

Languages
  - Official: Punjabi
- Time zone: UTC+5:30 (IST)
- PIN: 144509
- Telephone code: 01884
- ISO 3166 code: IN-PB
- Post office: Khan Khana (S.O)
- Website: nawanshahr.nic.in

Sadhpur is a village in Shaheed Bhagat Singh Nagar district of Punjab State, India. It is located 7.3 kilometres (4.5 mi) away from sub post office Khan Khana, 26 kilometres (16 mi) from Nawanshahr, 19.7 kilometres (12.2 mi) from district headquarter Shaheed Bhagat Singh Nagar and 116 kilometres (72 mi) from state capital Chandigarh. The village is administrated by Sarpanch an elected representative of the village.

== Demography ==
As of 2011, Sadhpur has a total number of 187 houses and population of 938 of which 432 include are males while 506 are females according to the report published by Census India in 2011. The literacy rate of Sadhpur is 82.87% higher than the state average of 75.84%. The population of children under the age of 6 years is 80 which is 8.53% of total population of Sadhpur, and child sex ratio is approximately 1222 as compared to Punjab state average of 846.

Most of the people are from Schedule Caste which constitutes 5.33% of total population in Sadhpur. The town does not have any Schedule Tribe population so far.

As per the report published by Census India in 2011, 246 people were engaged in work activities out of the total population of Sadhpur which includes 197 males and 49 females. According to census survey report 2011, 73.17% workers describe their work as main work and 26.83% workers are involved in Marginal activity providing livelihood for less than 6 months.

== Education ==
The village has a Punjabi medium, co-ed primary school established in 1955. The school provide mid-day meal per Indian Midday Meal Scheme. As per Right of Children to Free and Compulsory Education Act the school provide free education to children between the ages of 6 and 14.

Amardeep Singh Shergill Memorial college Mukandpur, KC Engineering College and Doaba Khalsa Trust Group Of Institutions are the nearest colleges. Industrial Training Institute for women (ITI Nawanshahr) is 26 kilometres (16 mi). The village is 94 kilometres (58 mi) away from Chandigarh University, 73 kilometres (45 mi) from Indian Institute of Technology and 29 kilometres (18 mi) away from Lovely Professional University.

== Transport ==
Banga train station is the nearest train station however, Phagwara Junction railway station is 22 kilometres (14 mi) away from the village. Sahnewal Airport is the nearest domestic airport which located 54 kilometres (34 mi) away in Ludhiana and the nearest international airport is located in Chandigarh also Sri Guru Ram Dass Jee International Airport is the second nearest airport which is 138 kilometres (86 mi) away in Amritsar.

== See also ==
- List of villages in India
