= Sandwan =

- Village
- Location in Punjab, India Sandwan (India)
- Coordinates: 31.2318481°N 75.8904111°E
- Country: India
- State: Punjab
- District: Shaheed Bhagat Singh Nagar

Government
  - Type: Panchayat raj
  - Body: Gram panchayat

Population (2011)
  - Total: 3,181
- Sex ratio 1637/1544 ♂/♀

Languages
  - Official: Punjabi
- Time zone: UTC+5:30 (IST)
- PIN: 144503
- ISO 3166 code: IN-PB
- Post office: Pharala (S.O)
- Website: nawanshahr.nic.in

Sandwan is a village in Shaheed Bhagat Singh Nagar district of Punjab State, India. It is located 2.5 kilometres (1.6 mi) away from sub post office Pharala, 28 kilometres (17 mi) from Nawanshahr, 26 kilometres (16 mi) from district headquarter Shaheed Bhagat Singh Nagar and 118 kilometres (73 mi) from state capital Chandigarh. The village is administrated by Sarpanch an elected representative of the village.

== Demography ==
As of 2011, Sandwan has a total number of 657 houses and population of 3181 of which 1637 include are males while 1544 are females according to the report published by Census India in 2011. The literacy rate of Sandwan is 80.74% higher than the state average of 75.84%. The population of children under the age of 6 years is 330 which is 10.37% of total population of Sandwan, and child sex ratio is approximately 953 as compared to Punjab state average of 846.

Most of the people are from Schedule Caste which constitutes 56.27% of total population in Sandwan. The town does not have any Schedule Tribe population so far.

As per the report published by Census India in 2011, 1034 people were engaged in work activities out of the total population of Sandwan which includes 936 males and 98 females. According to census survey report 2011, 73.60% workers describe their work as main work and 26.40% workers are involved in Marginal activity providing livelihood for less than 6 months.

== Education ==
The village has a Punjabi language co-ed primary school established in 1935.

== See also ==
- List of villages in India
