= Lodhipur =

- Village
- Location in Punjab, India Lodhipur (India)
- Coordinates: 31.117175°N 76.0487759°E
- Country: India
- State: Punjab
- District: Shaheed Bhagat Singh Nagar

Government
  - Type: Panchayat raj
  - Body: Gram panchayat
- Elevation: 251 m (823 ft)

Population (2011)
  - Total: 1,193
- Sex ratio 590/603 ♂/♀

Languages
  - Official: Punjabi
- Time zone: UTC+5:30 (IST)
- PIN: 144513
- Telephone code: 01823
- ISO 3166 code: IN-PB
- Post office: Amargarh (B.O)
- Website: nawanshahr.nic.in

Lodhipur is a village in Shaheed Bhagat Singh Nagar district of Punjab State, India. It is located 4 kilometres (2.5 mi) away from postal branch office Amargarh, 6.4 kilometres (4.0 mi) from Nawanshahr, 3.8 kilometres (2.4 mi) from district headquarter Shaheed Bhagat Singh Nagar and 100 kilometres (62 mi) from state capital Chandigarh. The village is administrated by Sarpanch an elected representative of the village.

== Demography ==
As of 2011, Lodhipur has a total number of 261 houses and population of 1193 of which 590 include are males while 603 are females according to the report published by Census India in 2011. The literacy rate of Lodhipur is 74.10%, lower than the state average of 75.84%. The population of children under the age of 6 years is 135 which is 11.32% of total population of Lodhipur, and child sex ratio is approximately 824 as compared to Punjab state average of 846.

Most of the people are from Schedule Caste which constitutes 70.75% of total population in Lodhipur. The town does not have any Schedule Tribe population so far.

As per the report published by Census India in 2011, 354 people were engaged in work activities out of the total population of Lodhipur which includes 340 males and 14 females. According to census survey report 2011, 99.44% workers describe their work as main work and 0.56% workers are involved in Marginal activity providing livelihood for less than 6 months.

== Education ==
The village has a Punjabi medium, co-ed primary school founded in 1959. The schools provide mid-day meal as per Indian Midday Meal Scheme. As per Right of Children to Free and Compulsory Education Act the school provide free education to children between the ages of 6 and 14.

KC Engineering College and Doaba Khalsa Trust Group Of Institutions are the nearest colleges. Industrial Training Institute for women (ITI Nawanshahr) is 9.8 kilometres (6.1 mi). The village is 79 kilometres (49 mi) away from Chandigarh University, 56 kilometres (35 mi) from Indian Institute of Technology and 42 kilometres (26 mi) away from Lovely Professional University.

== Transport ==
Nawanshahr train station is the nearest train station however, Garhshankar Junction railway station is 23 kilometres (14 mi) away from the village. Sahnewal Airport is the nearest domestic airport which located 60 kilometres (37 mi) away in Ludhiana and the nearest international airport is located in Chandigarh also Sri Guru Ram Dass Jee International Airport is the second nearest airport which is 150 kilometres (93 mi) away in Amritsar.

== See also ==
- List of villages in India
