= Chak Dana =

- Village
- Location in Punjab, India Chak Dana (India)
- Coordinates: 31.0461135°N 75.9514099°E
- Country: India
- State: Punjab
- District: Shaheed Bhagat Singh Nagar

Government
  - Type: Panchayat raj
  - Body: Gram panchayat
- Elevation: 251 m (823 ft)

Population (2011)
  - Total: 1,647
- Sex ratio 831/816 ♂/♀

Languages
  - Official: Punjabi
- Time zone: UTC+5:30 (IST)
- PIN: 144422
- Telephone code: 01823
- ISO 3166 code: IN-PB
- Post office: Urapar
- Website: nawanshahr.nic.in

Chak Dana, also spelled Chakdana, is a village in Shaheed Bhagat Singh Nagar district of Punjab State, India, 1.3 kilometres (0.81 mi) from postal head office Urapar and 10.6 kilometres (6.6 mi) from district headquarters Shaheed Bhagat Singh Nagar. The village is administrated by an elected sarpanch.

== Demography ==
As of 2011, Chak Dana has a total number of 343 houses and population of 1647 of which 831 include are males while 816 are females according to the report published by Census India in 2011. The literacy rate of Chak Dana is 86.14%, higher than the state average of 75.84%. The population of children under the age of 6 years is 139 which is 8.44% of total population of Chak Dana, and child sex ratio is approximately 829 as compared to Punjab state average of 846.

Most of the people are from Schedule Caste which constitutes 7.59% of total population in Chak Dana. The town does not have any Schedule Tribe population so far.

As per the report published by Census India in 2011, 471 people were engaged in work activities out of the total population of Chak Dana which includes 426 males and 45 females. According to census survey report 2011, 92.14% workers describe their work as main work and 7.86% workers are involved in Marginal activity providing livelihood for less than 6 months.

== Education ==
The village has a Punjabi medium, co-ed upper primary with secondary school founded in 1969.

== See also ==
- List of villages in India
