= Jhingan =

Jhingan or Jhingon is an Indian surname. Notable people with the surname include:

it is a sub caste in bhatia biradari… people at times used sub caste as surname’s for their identify

- Priya Jhingan (fl. from 1992), Indian Army officer
- Sandesh Jhingan (born 1993), Indian footballer

== See also ==
- Jhingran
