= Sahlon =

Village in Doaba, Punjab (IN)

Sahlon Sahlon
- Village
- Country: India
- State: Punjab

Government
  - Type: democratic

Languages
  - Official: Punjabi
- Time zone: UTC+5:30 (IST)
- PIN: 144421
- Telephone code: 1823

Sahlon village is located in the Nawanshahr district of Punjab. It is also known as the "soldiers village" because lot of young people used to enlist in the army and serve the nation.

There are four Sikh shrines and temples grace this village. There are two schools in the village. Many local residents have immigrated to far away lands like North America and the United Kingdom and also to Europe.

One of the major castes people belong to in this village are the Rajput caste and they carry the last name Bhatti. The main source of income to the locals is agriculture.
