= Jagatpur, Punjab =

Jagatpur
- Village
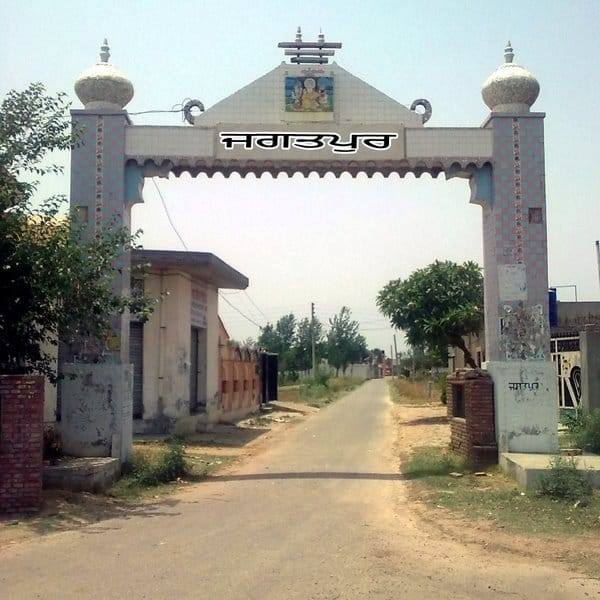

- Location in Punjab Location in India
- Coordinates: 31.1357759°N 75.9284544°E
- Country: India
- State: Punjab
- District: Shaheed Bhagat Singh Nagar

Government
  - Type: Panchayat raj
  - Body: Gram panchayat
- Elevation: 254 m (833 ft)

Population (2011)
  - Total: 2,151
- Sex ratio 1084/1067 ♂/♀

Languages
  - Official: Punjabi
- Time zone: UTC+5:30 (IST)
- PIN: 144507
- Telephone code: 01823
- ISO 3166 code: IN-PB
- Post office: Mukandpur
- Website: babaramchand.org

Jagatpur is a village in Shaheed Bhagat Singh Nagar district of Punjab State, India. It is 2.2 kilometres (1.4 mi) away from postal head office Mukandpur, 9.3 kilometres (5.8 mi) from Banga, 12 kilometres (7.5 mi) from district headquarters Shaheed Bhagat Singh Nagar and 113 kilometres (70 mi) from state capital Chandigarh. The village is administrated by Sarpanch an elected representative of the village.

== Demography ==
As of 2011, Jagatpur has a total number of 462 houses and population of 2,151 of which 1,084 include are males while 1,067 are females according to the report published by Census India in 2011. literacy rate of Jagatpur is 80.35, higher than state average of 75.84%. The population of children under the age of 6 years is 207 which is 9.62% of total population of Jagatpur, and child sex ratio is approximately 984 as compared to Punjab state average of 846. Most of the people are from Schedule Caste which constitutes 36.12% of total population in Jagatpur. The town does not currently have any Schedule Tribe population.

Per census 2011, 671 people were engaged in work activities out of the total population of Jagatpur which includes 594 males and 77 females. According to census survey report 2011, 74.52% workers describe their work as main work and 25.48% workers are involved in Marginal activity providing livelihood for less than six months. Web site : www.jagatpur.org

== Education ==
The village has a Punjabi medium, co-ed primary with secondary school (Ghs Jagatpur School). The school provide mid-day meal as per Indian Midday Meal Scheme and the meal prepared in school premises. As per Right of Children to Free and Compulsory Education Act the school provides free education to children between the ages of 6 and 14. Amardeep Singh Shergill Memorial college is the nearest college.

== Transport ==
Banga train station is the nearest train station however, Phagwara Junction railway station is 21 kilometres (13 mi) from the village. Sahnewal Airport is the nearest domestic airport and is 52 kilometres (32 mi) away in Ludhiana and the nearest international airport is in Chandigarh. Sri Guru Ram Dass Jee International Airport is the second nearest airport, and is 138 kilometres (86 mi) away in Amritsar.

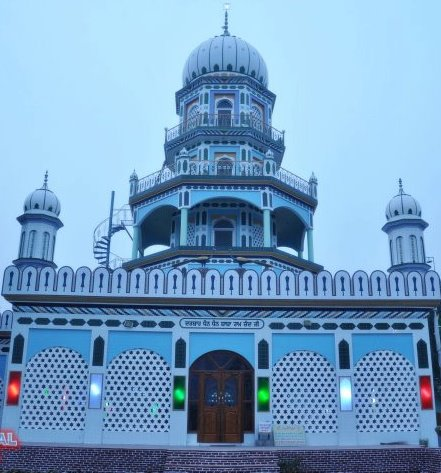

== Smadh Dhan Dhan Baba Ram Chand Ji ==
The basic details of Baba Ram Chand Ji's life do not get much, but whatever. He is trying to associate himself with the sangat so that the work of the sangat will come in the coming time. Baba ji was a resident of village Jagatpur but his parents' name was not known even in Shergill clan. His wife's name was Kajali, and he had three sons, 'Raja ji', 'Bhaga ji', and 'Jaga ji'.

Whenever there is talk of the Chowk Mela, its beginnings and history begin with Baba Ji. One day Baba Ji encountered the entire group of Lakhdata Ji's servants. He asked what you do in Bhai, whose name do you ask and where do you go, and whom do you adore, they answered the question and said that we are the servants of millions of governing associations. And we ask in His name, whatever pleases Him with a sincere heart, His desires are fulfilled.

He rides in millions of jobs, pays for everyone. Even then it is called the Giver of Millions. Baba ji said that if my wishes were fulfilled then I would ask him, what are your demands. Baba ji - If I give a little of my cattle then I will give that extra wine to millions of donors. The servants prayed in earnest for six prayers and Bhai Ram Singh also prayed before the donor.

Years went by while doing labor. As the months passed, Bhai Singh Ji continued to serve the horse. Then, when the time came, the horse gave a very beautiful appearance, and the mind itself was very happy. That millions of donors have heard. Then those days come, in the month of thugs. Servants would think and say in their heartfelt words: "Jut is very good-hearted, so that no one gets angry and the giver hears."

When the servants met with Bhai Ram Singh, they asked what Sardar ji Chhodi gave, then he said that my donor ji had listened, the jhodi had given extra, so the happiness of the servants was no limit. Kotti-koty thanked you and said that thank you maid for keeping our shame. But then Baba ji bole bhai sevak is such that it is worth many millions but if I give Manu a little more, he should give to his Guru, Anandpur, Guru Ji too should be cheated.

The servants then prayed, complaining that you have a desire for your name, please put the shame of our poor as before. With such prayers, the servants left for the next village, returning to their homes as they filled the outposts, hitting the floors of Pir Jussa, saluting Multan Panchase and bowing at the court. The following year, the little ones made a difference, and when the servants of the millions di, there was no limit to their happiness. Bhai Ram Singh also made up his mind to go out to the posts. Your wife, Kajali Ji, prepared herself for the trip. He started the village journey and the first phase of the Sangha was at Bada village. The first Lakdatta ji changed his face to beg for himself at Bada village and said, "Your request of the horse has been fulfilled. Baba ji said that it was not possible to meet this pillar and then the next journey to Bhutar began. Likewise, from Bada village to Boparao, Roarka Kalan, Vadalas, Jandiala Manjki, Boparaya Donna, Heran, Khanpur Khandpur, Khondpur, Khondpur, and Khondpur.) And the next stage is Talwandi Choudhury.

Lakh donor ji changed his face several times in the face and asked for his horse but he did not rush and said that Pir himself would come and cheat. Once Pir came to change the face of identity and asked for horses with Rohb, but he was not scared and answered his questions and said that Pir himself would come and cheat. The sangat likewise crossed the Beas river and filled the outposts from the adjoining villages and proceeded to the next stage by watering. The river crosses Beas to Goindwal, Fatehabad, Naurangabad, Kot Dharmachand, Sarai Amanat Khan and Pir Raza Tal and beyond to Multan.

Baba ji and other sangat also made Multan Panchha, Sajda Salam, paid their vows and asked for other prayers Baba ji tied the horse with a tree and started waiting for Pir Ji. Kept waiting It is said that there used to be a dog that Pir ji also came in disguise and demanded horses, but he refused. At last the Sakhi Sultan, the son of Multan, the son of Multan, the son of Mata Mum and everyone who filled the pockets of his brother, completed the examination of his servant and made a conspiracy in front of Baba Ji. Baba ji saluted himself and continued to look after the donor for a long time. Then he cheated the donor but Pir Ji said that horses should not be taken like this, if they were to be taken like this, they would have taken a very village. Take this horse, we will come to Anandpur Sahib and take it from you. Likewise, he returned to the village, promising to visit Anandpur and shared the whole conversation with his family.

== See also ==
- List of villages in India
