= Naura, India =

Naura naurangabaad 9 raah
- town
- Location in Punjab, India Naura (India)
- Coordinates: 31.192172°N 76.049377°E
- Country: India
- State: Punjab
- District: SBS Nagar

Government
  - Sarpanch (Elected Head of Town): Smt. Amritpal Kaur

Population
  - Total: 7,500

Languages
  - Official: Punjabi
- Time zone: UTC+5:30 (IST)
- PIN: 144508
- Telephone code: 01823

Naura is a town in the Shahid Bhagat Singh Nagar district of Punjab, India. It is located about 2 km from Khatkar Kalan, the home town of Shaheed Bhagat Singh, on the Banga - Gharshanker road. Jawaharlal Nehru, first Prime Minister of India visited Naura attending agricultural trade show along with his daughter Indira Gandhi. The town is nicknamed across many Punjabi villages as: "Naura Bhaura".

== Population ==
The town's 2001 population was 3,331. Many of the town's residents and families are settled in other parts of India and overseas, but they still maintain their ancestral homes in the town.

== Education ==
Naura is home to a branch of the District Institute of Education and Training where primary school teachers are educated and trained.

The town has access to multiple colleges in the nearby cities of Banga, Nawanshahr, Gharshankar and Phagwara.
