= Barnala Kalan =

- town
- Location in Punjab, India
- Coordinates: 31.1167°N 76.1333°E
- Country: India
- State: Punjab
- District: Shahid Bhagat Singh Nagar

Population (2001)
  - Total: 2,394

Languages
  - Official: Punjabi
- Time zone: UTC+5:30 (IST)
- PIN: 144516
- Vehicle registration: PB-32

Barnala Kalan is a town in Shahid Bhagat Singh Nagar district in the Indian state of Punjab. It is located 1 km from Nawanshahr city.
