= Ladhian =

Ladian is a small village situated in district Shahid Bhagat Singh Nagar in Punjab, India. It is 10 kilometres (6.2 mi) from Banga, on Banga to Katarian Road. This village belonged to Master Sudhagar Singh Dhindsa (died 2001), Dr. Kuldip Singh Dhindsa (died 2022 in Montreal Canada) and Kuljit Singh Dhindsa (died 2012), the prominent social reformer. Sant Amar Jot Partap Singh (Baba kar ji) arrived and blessed this village many times.

== Geography ==
The village is situated at approximately 335 kilometres (208 mi) from New Delhi, 155 kilometres (96 mi) from Amritsar and 1,410 kilometres (880 mi) from Mumbai. It is in the Northwest part of India; a few hundred kilometres south of Kashmir and to the west of the Himalayan foothills of Punjab and Himachal Pradesh. On a clear day, the snow-clad peaks of the Dhauladhar range are visible in the distant horizon. It is also linked by Banga-Katarian Road with Amritsar-Chandigarh GT road and Amritsar-Anandpur Sahib route on NH-1.

== Religious places ==
There are two Gurdwaras situated in Ladhian. Sant Shiva ji da Dera, Gurdwara Hari Sar, Mananhana, Hoshiarpur, Gurdwara Charan Kanwal Sahib, Peer Baba Gulami Shah, Shiv Mandir on Mukandpur Road are the frequently visited religious places within 10 kilometres (6.2 mi) from there.

== Banking facilities ==
Most of Nationalised Government Sector Bank as well as Private Sector Bank is situated within 10 kilometres (6.2 mi) from here society in Katarian, State Bank of India, Punjab National Bank, Bank of Baroda, Axis Bank, ICICI Bank, UCO Bank, Oriental Bank of Commerce, HDFC Bank, Allahabad Bank, Syndicate Bank, SBoP, Bank of India, Corporation Bank, IDBI Bank, etc.
