= Sarhala Ranuan =

Sarhala Ranuan is a village in Nawanshahar district now Shahid Bhagat Singh Nagar district in Punjab. This village is located 10 kilometres (6.2 mi) from Phagwara and 6 km from Banga off Phagwara-Chandigarh main road. The neighbouring villages are Chak Mai Dass, Kultham, Bharo Mazara, Chak Ramu, Chak Guru, Nano Mazara, Dosanjh Kalan. The historic and famous Gurdwara Panj Tahlian is situated outside the village. The Gurdwara was built to commemorate the area in which Guru Hargobind Ji tied his horse as he stayed in the local area. Sarhala Ranuan is also famous for celebrating Hola Mohalla Mela.

== Demographics ==
According to Census 2011 Sarhala Ranuan has a total population of approximately 1392 inhabitants and 304 households. The village has a very diverse community . Jatt Sikh, Adharmis, Bahmans, Jheer, nayi, sheembe, Bazigar, Suniar, lohar And tarkhan in the village. Doaba region being famous for immigration for long time, many of the households has family members immigrated from the village to England, Canada, United States and other countries. NRIs have contributed to the development of the village including building for Govt. Senior Secondary School, Gym and park. The village also have Govt. Ayurvedic Dispensary. Ranu and Rana is the surname of most Jatts in the Village.
