= Kultham =

- Village
- Location in Punjab, India Kultham (India)
- Coordinates: 31.194401°N 75.848743°E
- Country: India
- State: Punjab
- District: Shaheed Bhagat Singh Nagar

Government
  - Type: Panchayat raj
  - Body: Gram panchayat

Population (2011)
  - Total: 2,511
- Sex ratio 1295/1216 ♂/♀

Languages
  - Official: Punjabi
- Time zone: UTC+5:30 (IST)
- PIN: 144501
- Telephone code: 01884
- ISO 3166 code: IN-PB
- Post office: Kultham
- Website: kultham.ml

Kultham is a village in Shaheed Bhagat Singh Nagar district of Punjab State, India. It is located 15 kilometres (9.3 mi) away from Banga, 10 kilometres (6.2 mi) from Phagwara, 27 kilometres (17 mi) from district headquarter Shaheed Bhagat Singh Nagar and 119 kilometres (74 mi) from state capital Chandigarh. The village is administrated by Sarpanch an elected representative of the village. Singer Avtar Singh Kang was born in this village and later went to the United Kingdom.

== Demography ==
As of 2011, Kultham has a total number of 523 houses and population of 2511 of which 1295 include are males while 1216 are females according to the report published by Census India in 2011. The literacy rate of Kultham is 78.91%, higher than the state average of 75.84%. The population of children under the age of 6 years is 211 which is 8.40% of total population of Kultham, and child sex ratio is approximately 803 as compared to Punjab state average of 846.

Most of the people are from Schedule Caste which constitutes 66.15% of total population in Kultham. The town does not have any Schedule Tribe population so far.

As per the report published by Census India in 2011, 716 people were engaged in work activities out of the total population of Kultham which includes 675 males and 41 females. According to census survey report 2011, 98.74% workers describe their work as main work and 1.26% workers are involved in Marginal activity providing livelihood for less than 6 months.

== Education ==
The village has a Punjabi medium, co-ed primary school established in 1938. The schools provide mid-day meal as per Indian Midday Meal Scheme. The school provide free education to children between the ages of 6 and 14 as per Right of Children to Free and Compulsory Education Act. The village also has an privet un-aided Punjabi medium, co-ed upper primary with secondary school which was established in 1960.

Amardeep Singh Shergill Memorial college Mukandpur and Sikh National College Banga are the nearest colleges. Industrial Training Institute for women (ITI Nawanshahr) is 30 kilometres (19 mi) The village is 76 kilometres (47 mi) from Indian Institute of Technology and 18 kilometres (11 mi) away from Lovely Professional University.

== Transport ==
The village has a railway station (Kulthamabdullashah Halt) which is named after Abdullah Shah Qadri and located 1 kilometre (0.62 mi) from State Highway 18. Phagwara Junction train station is 10.4 kilometres (6.5 mi) away from the village. Sahnewal Airport is the nearest domestic airport located 57 kilometres (35 mi) away in Ludhiana and the nearest international airport is located in Chandigarh also Sri Guru Ram Dass Jee International Airport is the second nearest airport which is 126 kilometres (78 mi) away in Amritsar.

== Kultham.ml - Website ==
The village has a private website which collects data that otherwise would be near impossible. http://kultham.ml/ was created by the subsection of Asia Foundation.

== See also ==
- List of villages in India
