= Jhingran =

Jhingran is a village situated in Nawanshahr district (also known as Shahid Bhagat Singh Nagar) in Punjab, India.
