= Urapar =

- village
- Location in Punjab, India
- Coordinates: 31°3′13.16″N 75°57′54.89″E
- Country: India
- State: Punjab
- District: Shahid Bhagat Singh Nagar
- Elevation: 253 m (830 ft)

Population
  - Total: Approximately 9,000

Languages
- Time zone: UTC+5:30 (IST)
- PIN: 144422
- Telephone code: 01823248--- International code 011911823248
- Vehicle registration: PB32-
- Coastline: 0 kilometres (0 mi)
- Nearest city: Nawanshahr
- Climate: 30 (Köppen)
- Avg. summer temperature: 40 °C (104 °F)
- Avg. winter temperature: 20 °C (68 °F)

Urapar is a small town on the Nawanshahar-Phillaur road in the Shahid Bhagat Singh Nagar district of the state of Punjab, India. Urapar, the capital of the Saini, is also known as Aur-Urapar or Chak-Urapar. It is located 17 km from Nawanshahr, 17 km from Phillaur, and 15 km from Banga.

== History ==
Urapar is famous for the Gurudwara Shahidganj Temple, which was built to honor the martyrs in the battle of 1711, in which Banda Singh Bahadur led the Khalsa Army in a pitched battle against the army of Shamas Khan. The Rahon and the Sikh soldiers who were captured were cremated there. There are eight gurudwaras, three Hindu temples, and three mosques in Urapar.

The late Sardar Sampuran Singh Sena was the only sarpanch (head of a village) who had served four terms (20 years) in a row. He was also the first sarpanch after the city gained its freedom. During his tenure as sarpanch, he established a veterinary clinic. In appreciation of his community services, the governor of Punjab gave him a commendatory certificate at the opening ceremony. He approached Chotu Ram, the education minister of Joint Punjab, to upgrade Khalsa Elementary School of Chak-Urapar to a high school.

There are more than 100 families from Urapar currently living in Toronto, Ontario, Canada. Every year they get together and celebrate Urapar Day.

== Demographics ==
As of the 2001 India census, Urapar had a population of 4,251 (52% male and 48% female). Urapar has an average literacy rate of 87%, higher than the national average of 74% (male literacy is 79%, and female literacy is 71%). In Nawanshahr, 12% of the population is under nine years of age.

== Prominent residents ==
- Harcharan Singh (1914 – 2006), playwright

== Weather ==
The village has a humid subtropical climate with cold winters and hot summers. Summers last from April to June and winters from November to February. The temperatures in summer vary from an average high of 48 °C (118 °F) to an average low of 25 °C (77 °F). Winter temperatures vary from 19 °C (66 °F) to -5 °C (23 °F).

The climate is generally dry, except during the brief southwest monsoon season from July to August. The average annual rainfall is about 70 cm.

== Health facilities ==
Health facilities include Guru Nanak Charitable Hospital located across the street from Gurudwara Shaidganj Sahib. The hospital is operated by the committee of Gurudwara Shaidganj Sahib and Sena.
