= Frank Ellis (economist) =

Agrarian development economist

Frank Ellis is an agrarian development economist who has specialised in the livelihoods approach to addressing poverty in the developing world. He is an Emeritus Professor in the School of Global Development (formerly DEV) at the University of East Anglia. His most noted publication is perhaps his (1988, 1993) Peasant economics: Farm households in agrarian development.

== Selected publications ==
- Ellis, Frank. (1988; 1993) Peasant economics: Farm households in agrarian development. Cambridge University Press
- Ellis, F. (1998). Household strategies and rural livelihood diversification. The journal of development studies, 35(1), 1-38.
- Ellis, F. (2000). Rural livelihoods and diversity in developing countries. Oxford university press.
