= Chak Alahi Bakhash =

- Village
- Location in Punjab, India Chak Alahi Bakhash (India)
- Coordinates: 31.0161638°N 76.2025503°E
- Country: India
- State: Punjab
- District: Shaheed Bhagat Singh Nagar

Government
  - Type: Panchayat raj
  - Body: Gram panchayat
- Elevation: 254 m (833 ft)

Population (2011)
  - Total: 459
- Sex ratio 240/219 ♂/♀

Languages
  - Official: Punjabi
- Time zone: UTC+5:30 (IST)
- PIN: 144515
- Telephone code: 01823
- ISO 3166 code: IN-PB
- Post office: Dangarpur
- Website: nawanshahr.nic.in

Chak Alahi Bakhash is a village in Shaheed Bhagat Singh Nagar district of Punjab, India, India, on the Sutlej River, 24 kilometres (15 mi) from district headquarters Shaheed Bhagat Singh Nagar and 88 kilometres (55 mi) from state capital Chandigarh. The village is administrated by an elected sarpanch.

== Demography ==
As of 2011, Chak Alahi Bakhash has a total number of 94 houses and population of 459 of which 240 include are males while 219 are females according to the report published by Census India in 2011. The literacy rate of Chak Alahi Bakhash is 86.80%, higher than the state average of 75.84%. The population of children under the age of 6 years is 65 which is 14.16% of total population of Chak Alahi Bakhash, and child sex ratio is approximately 757 as compared to Punjab state average of 846.

Most of the people are from Schedule Castes, 59.91% of the population. The town does not have any Schedule Tribe population.

As per the report published by Census India in 2011, 149 people were engaged in work activities, 124 males and 25 females. According to census survey report 2011, 79.19% workers describe their work as main work and 20.81% workers are involved in marginal activity providing work for less than 6 months.

== Education ==
The village has a Punjabi language, co-ed primary school founded in 1975.

== See also ==
- List of villages in India
