= Bakapur =

- Interactive map of Bakapur
- Coordinates: 31°08′44.13″N 76°12′25.95″E
- Country: India
- State: Punjab
- District: Nawanshahr

Bakapur is a village in the Nawanshahr District of Punjab State in India. Bakapur is 8.4 km from its Mandal Main Town Saroya, 9.9 km from its district Main City Nawanshahr, and 70 km from its State Main City Chandigarh.

Bakapur has a Shiv Mandir and Gurudwara sahib. Nearby villages include Simbli, Jainpur, Hyatpur Rurki. There is a primary school and government school to year 12 in the village. Bakapur is also serviced by a hospital.

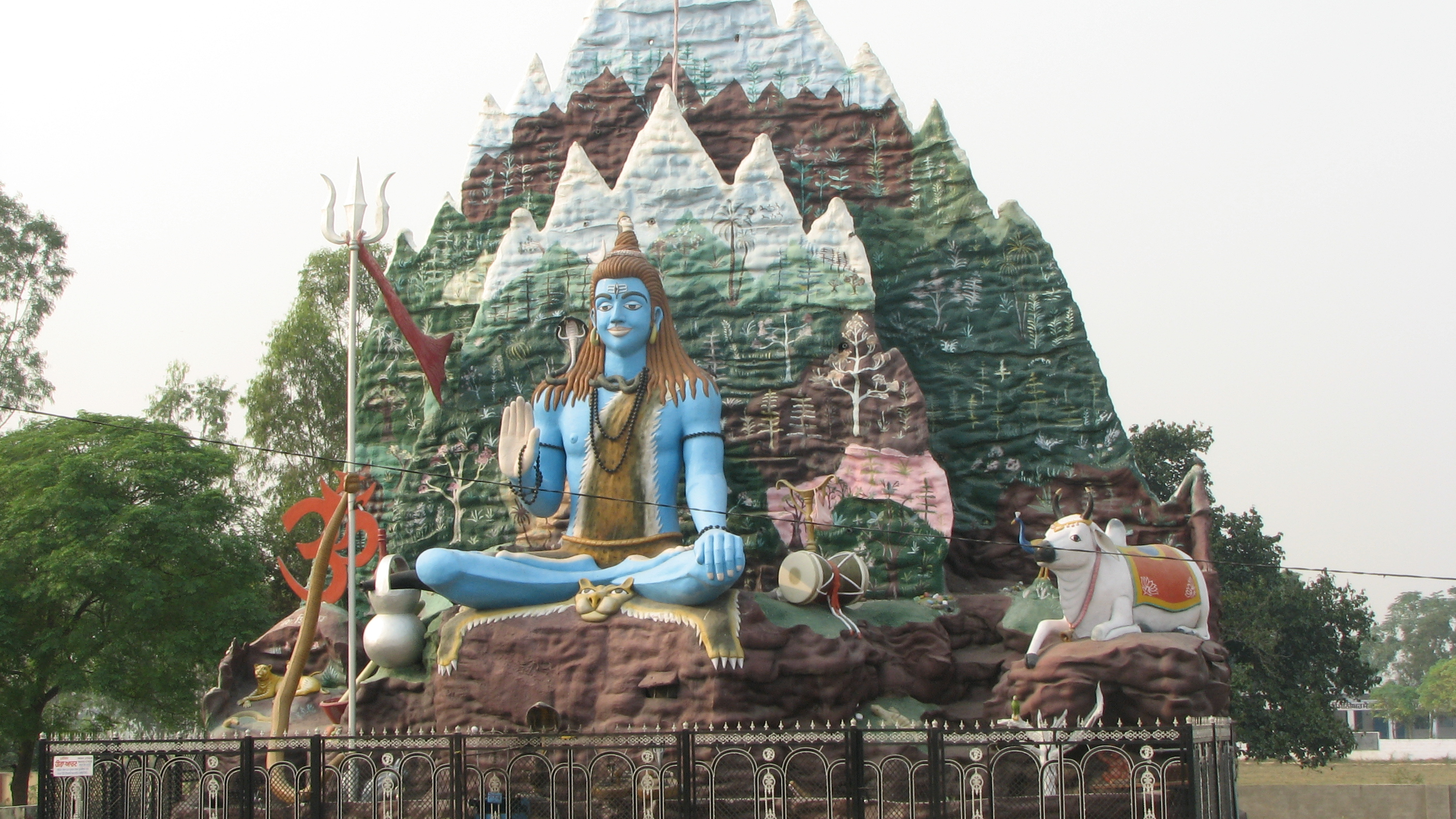
Recently build Shiva Statue near Shiva Mandir. Lit by fancy lights at night (Bakapur)

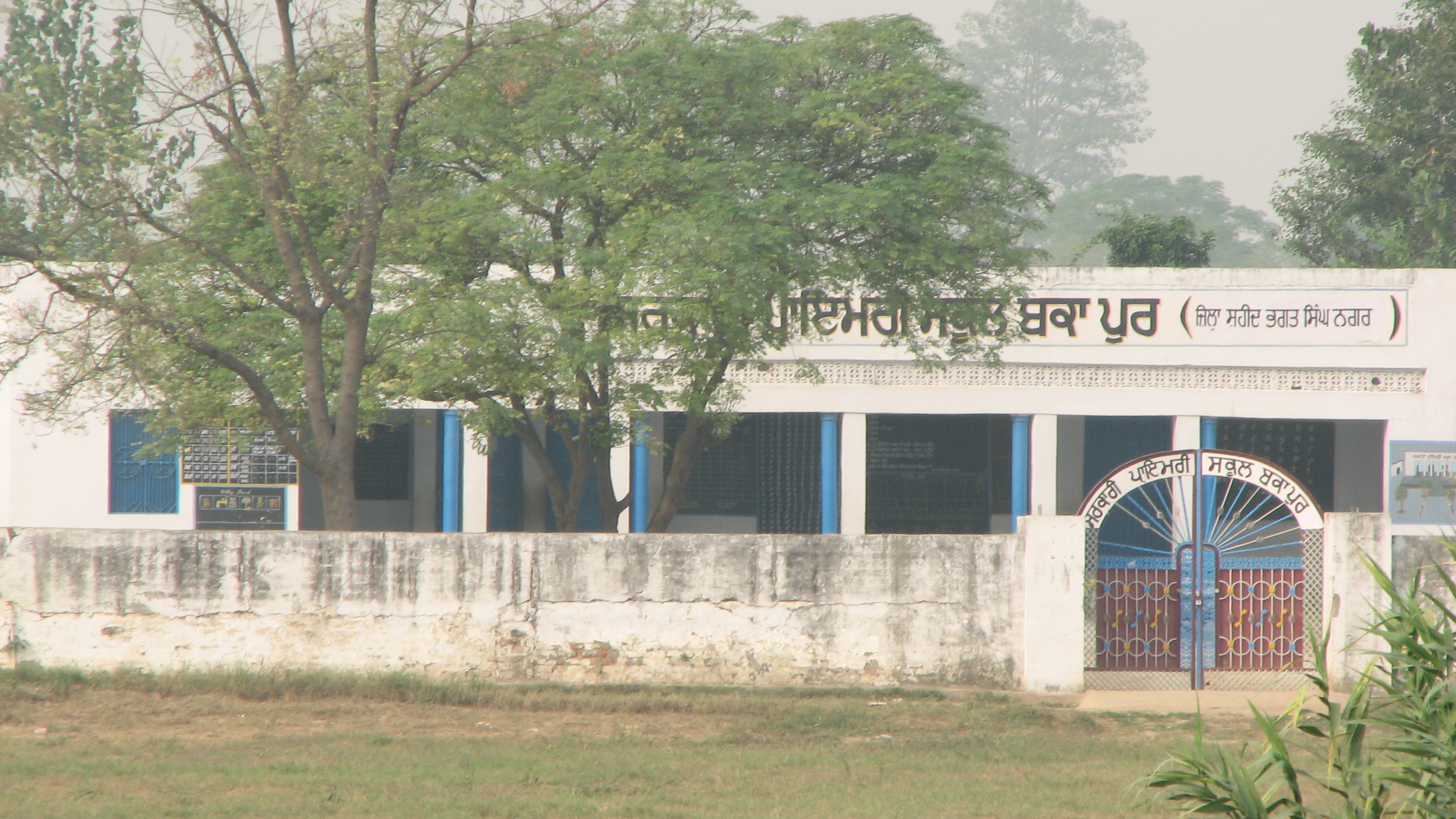
Primary school build in 1950 (Bakapur)

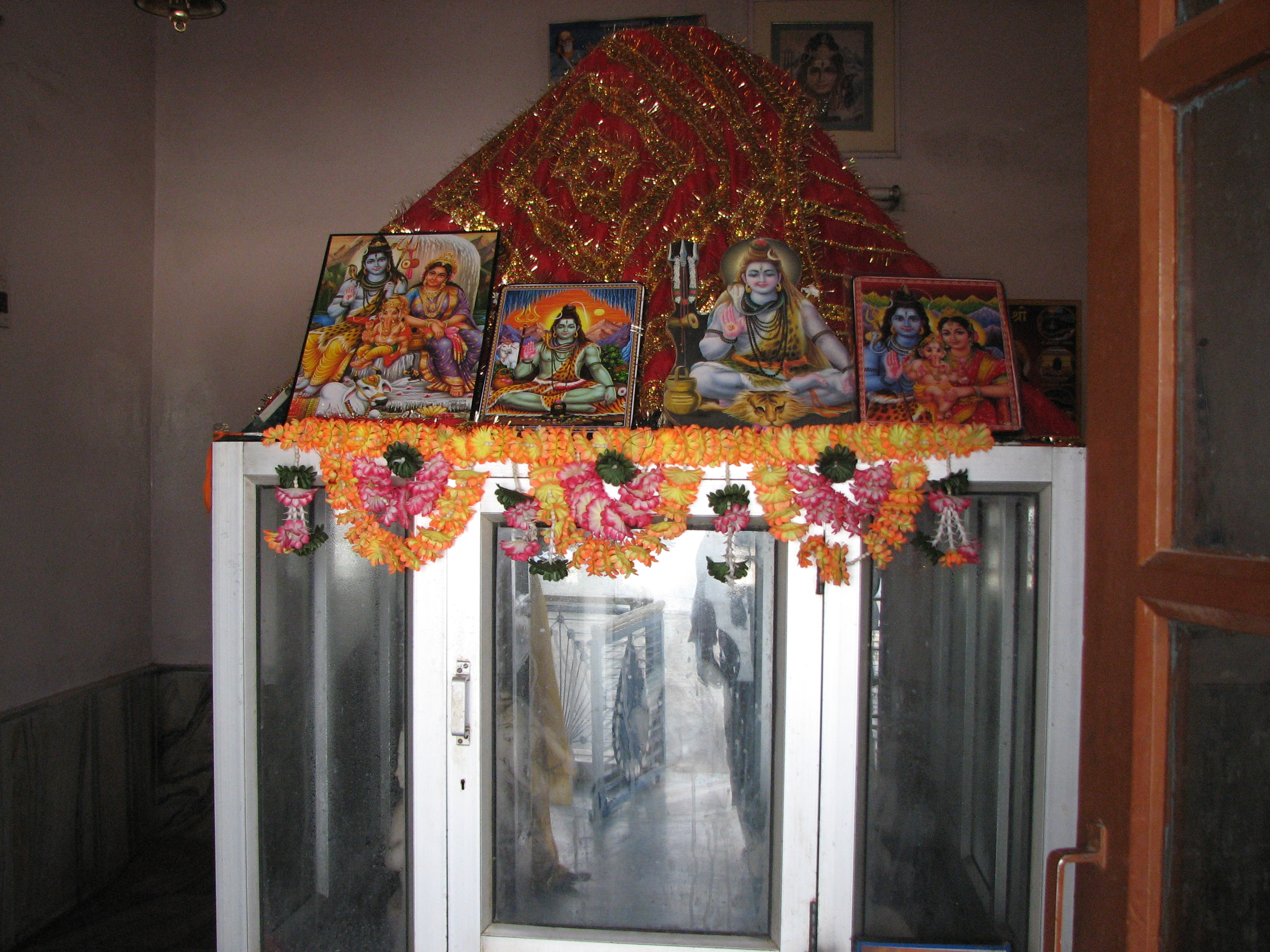
Shiv Mandir from inside (Bakapur)
