= Garhshankar =

- City
- Location in Punjab, India Location in India
- Coordinates: 31.2167°N 76.1333°E
- Country: India
- State: Punjab
- District: Hoshiarpur
- Established: 1000 A.D.
- Founder: Shankar

Population (2011)
  - Total: 17,000

Languages
  - Official: Punjabi
- Time zone: UTC+5:30 (IST)
- PIN: 144527
- Telephone code: 1884

Garhshankar is a city in Hoshiarpur district in the state of Punjab, India.

== History ==
Garshankar was founded by Doad Chandarvanshi Rajput king named Shankar Sahai at around 1000 AD, later his kila was destroyed by western conquerors. Garhshankar was converted as a Tehsil in the year of 1844 by the British administration. Before the Partition of British India in 1947, Garhshankar had a significant population of Muslim Ghorewaha (Kachhwaha) Rajputs. More information is available in census and 1904 Hoshiarpur report.

== Politics ==
Jai Krishan Singh Rouri, (AAP) is the second term MLA from Garhshankar Assembly Constituency, elected in 2022 Punjab Assembly Elections. He was first elected as MLA in 2017 Punjab Assembly Elections.

== Demographics ==
As per 2011 Census, Garhshankar had a population of 16,955. Males constitute 52% of the population and females 48%. Garhshankar has an average literacy rate of 73%, higher than the national average of 59.5%: male literacy is 76%, and female literacy is 70%.

== Railways ==
Garhshankar Railway Station, Satnaur Badesron Railway Station are the very nearby railway stations to Garhshankar.

== Education ==
- Govt. Sen. Sec. School, Garhshankar
- S.B.S. Model High School.
- Doaba Public Sen. Sec. School Parowal, Garhshankar
- Mount Carmel School, Garhshankar
- St. Soldier Divine Public School, Garhshankar
- Garhshankar Education Society, Nangal Road, Garhshankar.
- Babbar Akali Memorial Khalsa College Garhshankar
- P.D. Bedi Sen.Sec. Arya School.
- M.D.K.S.D. Public School
- Vidya Sagar Public School
- Shri Guru Teg Bahadur Sen.Sec.School
- B Bits (Computer Courses, and Training Center) Chandigarh Chowk, Garhshankar.
- Navjot Senior Secondary School.
