= Nawanshahr district =

District in Punjab, India

Shaheed Bhagat Singh Nagar district Nawanshahr district
- District of Punjab, India
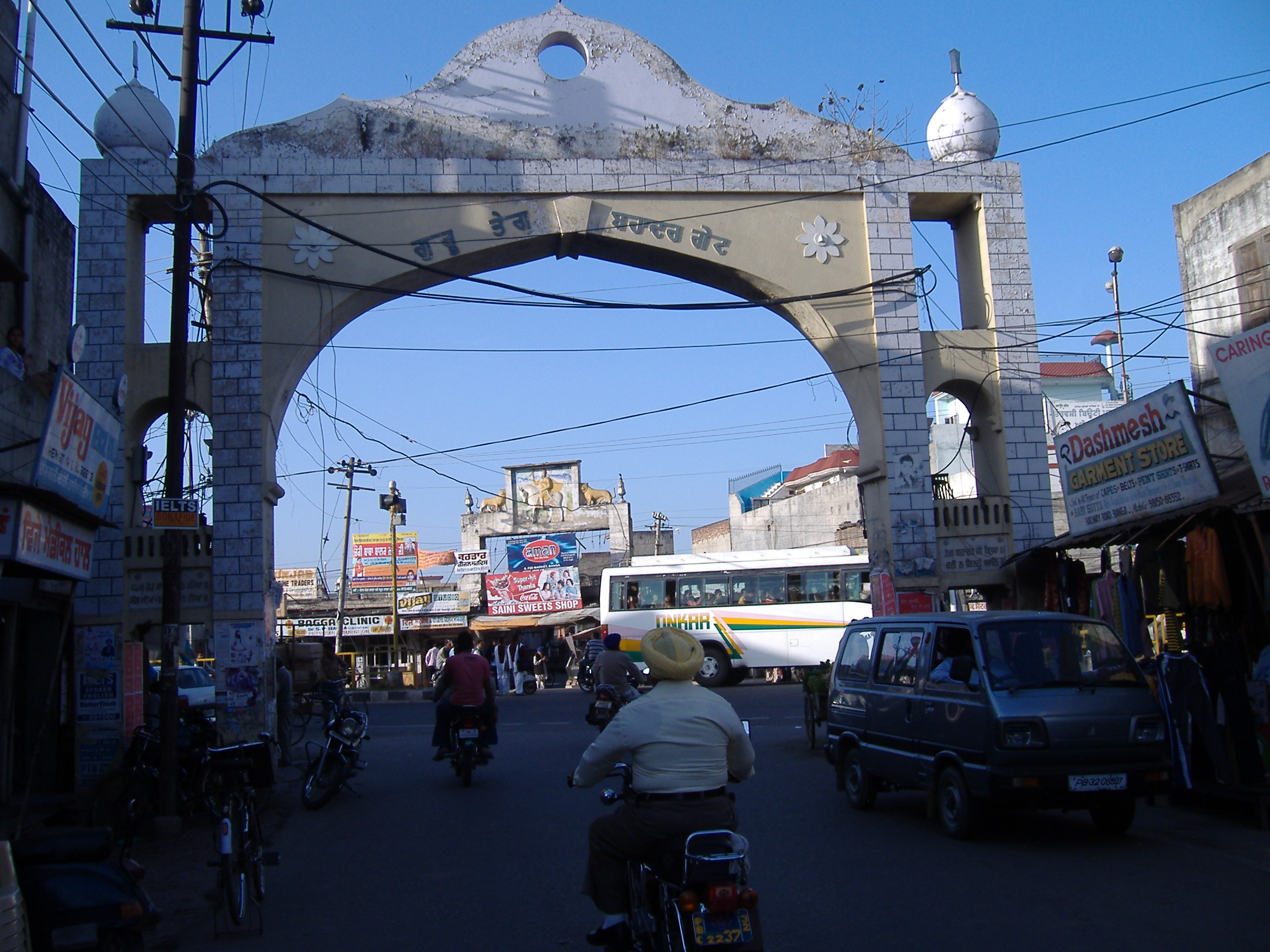
- Guru Teg Bahadur Gate in Banga

- Location in Punjab
- Coordinates: 31°7′31″N 76°6′59″E
- Country: India
- State: Punjab
- Region of Punjab: Doaba
- Named for: Bhagat Singh
- Headquarters: Nawanshahr

Government
  - Deputy Commissioner: Navjot Pal Singh Randhawa

Area
  - Total: 1,266 km^{2} (489 sq mi)

Population (2011)
  - Total: 612,310
  - Density: 483.7/km^{2} (1,253/sq mi)

Languages
  - Official: Punjabi
- Time zone: UTC+5:30 (IST)
- Telephone code: 01823 for Nawanshahr and Banga; 01885 for Balachaur
- Literacy: 80.3%
- Website: nawanshahr.nic.in

Nawanshahr district, officially named Shaheed Bhagat Singh Nagar district, is one of twenty-three districts of state of Punjab, India. It is located in Doaba region. It consists of three subdivisions, Nawanshahr, Banga, and Balachaur. There are three legislative seats in the district, Nawanshahr, Balachaur and Banga. They fall under the Anandpur Sahib Lok Sabha Constituency. Nawanshahr, the district headquarters is about 92 kilometres (57 mi) from Chandigarh, the state's capital. The district is part of the Ropar division.

As of 2011, it is the third least populous district of Punjab (out of 22), after Barnala and Fatehgarh Sahib.

== History ==
Shaheed Bhagat Singh Nagar district was formed from the Hoshiarpur and Jalandhar districts of Punjab on 7 November 1995, as the sixteenth district of Punjab State named from the headquarters town of Nawanshahr. Nawanshahr was founded by the migrants from Rahon near the Sutlej River as Rahon was in danger of being flooded. They named it Nawanshahar (meaning "New City").

Dewan Banna Mal Misr (Gautam) was born in Gautam Brahmin (Shori Gotra) family of Nawanshahr. He was son of Vaid Jhanda Mal of Nawanshahr, Dewan Banna Mal was manager with full sovereign powers of His Highness Maharaja Sir Randhir Singh Bahadur of Kapurthala's Estates in Oudh and served as Chief Minister Of Kapurthala State. Dewan Banna Mal built the temple Shivala Banna Mal near the Municipal Committee office, Nawanshahr. It was built in the year 1862 and tall and huge structure Haveli Banna Mal Di Haveli in Vaidan Mohalla in Nawanshahr. Dewan Banna Mal's sons Dewan Acchru Mal Gautam (Revenue Minister) and Dewan Sundri Mal Gautam (Revenue Minister) of Kapurthala State built Brahmkund Mandir behind Shalimar Bagh in Kapurthala. Dewan Banna Mal owned 3000 acres of land in the Mand area of Kapurthala on the bank of River Beas Bana Malwala after Dewan Banna Mal Gautam's name and Brahampur, Phagwara villages in Tehsil Phagwara. Descendants of Banna Mal Today lives in Kapurthala, Phagwara, New Delhi and Dehradun, Pandit Daljit Parshad Gautam Advocate of Kapurthala Renowned Civil Lawyer of Punjab practices in Kapurthala till his death in the Year 2010, Dewan Ambika Parshad ( Accountant General of Kapurthala State) his daughter Savitri Shori Mahajan a historian was married to The Great Historian of India and A Lawyer Vidya Dhar Mahajan, their daughters Mridula Mukherjee And Sucheta Mahajan are Historian and Working as a professor of Indian history in JNU New Delhi.

Later, the city was developed and constructed by Lala Paramanand Bhuchar (Sareen) who was the first major-scale thekedar of city. Lala Paramanand was given the first mould of large-brick design by Queen Elizabeth in the presence of the Maharaja Patiala in his courtroom as a token of gratitude to establish brick factories (Batha) in the city. Lala Paramanand build first planned Mandi (now known as old Dana Mandi) in around 1920 which even has his name "PN" on bricks and name on Foundation Stone at old Dana Mandi Gate. He resided in Lalliyan Mohalla (Lalleyan da Mohalla) situated in center of city. The mohalla have his Haveli there along with a common haveli which was residence of 100 families, a historical landmark in that mohalla made with Nanakshahi bricks.

Nawanshahr became a district in 1995 during the S. Harcharan Brar government, with strong efforts of the late S. Dilbag Singh, former Cabinet Minister and the then MLA of Nawanshahr. People of this district are economically sound. Many of the district's families have settled abroad. Consequently, much remittance is sent back to India, contributing to the district's economic development and prosperity. The prosperity of Doaba area can be appreciated by the fact that the price of land here is high, and far more than most of the districts in the state except Ludhiana and Chandigarh. Nawanshahr is rising due to the remittances from overseas Punjabis. Nawanshahr is connected to Jalandhar, Rahon and Jaijon by railway.

On 27 September 2008 at Khatkar Kalan, 8 km from Nawanshahr, the Punjab government announced that a district in the state would be named after the freedom fighter Bhagat Singh. The announcement was made by Punjab Chief Minister Parkash Singh Badal to mark the 101st anniversary of Bhagat Singh's birth. As a result, Nawanshahr district was renamed Shaheed Bhagat Singh Nagar.

== Geography ==
Shaheed Bhagat Singh Nagar district is located at 31.8°N 76.7°E. The total area is 1,258 square kilometres (km^{2}).

- SBS Nagar city has been declared by Swachh Survekshan-2020 as "the cleanest city in North India".

== Administration ==
=== Subdistricts of Nawanshahr district ===
According to the Indian government's integrated online directory, Nawanshahr district is divided into the following subdistricts (tehsils/subdivisions) and blocks:

- Subdistricts
  1. Balachaur
  2. Banga
  3. Nawanshahr
- Blocks:
  1. Aur
  2. Balachaur
  3. Banga
  4. Nawanshahr
  5. Saroya

== Healthcare ==
This region has abundant health facilities. There are numerous private clinics and nursing homes. Some of them claim to have the latest medical equipment. There is an adequate number of Government Hospitals, Dispensaries and Primary Health Centers in this area. The hospitals in Nawanshahr have capacity of 64 beds and are equipped with latest medical tools. Banga and Balachaur hospitals have capacities of 30 beds each. Also Mukandpur, Urapar, Sujjon, Saroya and Muzzaffarpur proved a variety of health services. Health services are available for every village in the district. Veterinary hospitals can be found in Nawanshahr, Rahon, Saroya, and Balachaur.

== Demographics ==
Historical population
Year	Pop.	±% p.a.
1901	269,801	—
1911	239,880	−1.17%
1921	244,966	+0.21%
1931	278,703	+1.30%
1941	328,209	+1.65%
1951	306,122	−0.69%
1961	332,944	+0.84%
1971	382,523	+1.40%
1981	456,434	+1.78%
1991	531,253	+1.53%
2001	587,468	+1.01%
2011	612,310	+0.42%

According to the 2011 census, Shaheed Bhagat Singh Nagar district has a population of 612,310, roughly equal to the nation of Solomon Islands or the US state of Vermont. This gives it a ranking of 522nd in India (out of a total of 640). The district has a population density of 479 inhabitants per square kilometre (1,240/sq mi). Its population growth rate over the decade 2001-2011 was 4.58%. Shaheed Bhagat Singh Nagar has a sex ratio of 954 females for every 1000 males, and a literacy rate of 80.3%. Scheduled Castes made up 42.51% of the population and the largest caste in the district is Ravidassia with a population of 214,293 which makes 34.88% of the whole district population.

=== Gender ===
The table below shows the sex ratio of SBS Nagar district through decades.

Sex ratio of SBS Nagar district
Census year	Ratio
2011	954
2001	914
1991	900
1981	898
1971	887
1961	900
1951	876
1941	865
1931	848
1921	821
1911	796
1901	856

The table below shows the child sex ratio of children below the age of 6 years in the rural and urban areas of SBS Nagar district.

Child sex ratio of children below the age of 6 years in SBS Nagar district
Year	Urban	Rural
2011	889	884
2001	804	809

=== Religion ===
Religion in Shaheed Bhagat Singh Nagar district (2011)
Religion	Percent
Hinduism	65.55%
Sikhism	31.50%
Islam	1.12%
Buddhism	0.96%
Other or not stated	0.87%

The table below shows the population of different religions in absolute numbers in the urban and rural areas of SBS Nagar district.

Absolute numbers of different religious groups in SBS Nagar district
Religion	Urban (2011)	Rural (2011)	Urban (2001)	Rural (2001)
Hindu	96,747	3,04,621	60,467	2,96,243
Sikh	24,312	1,68,573	18,585	2,01,271
Muslim	1,961	4,868	645	3,412
Christian	337	1,142	99	520
Other religions	2,059	7,690	1,270	4,956

=== Language ===
Languages of Shaheed Bhagat Singh Nagar district (2011)
1. Punjabi (94.6%)
2. Hindi (4.37%)
3. Others (1.00%)

In 2022, 94.63% of the population spoke Punjabi and 4.37% Hindi as their first language.

== Health ==
The table below shows the data from the district nutrition profile of children below the age of 5 years, in SBS Nagar, as of year 2020.

District nutrition profile of children under 5 years of age in SBS Nagar, year 2020
Indicators	Number of children (<5 years)	Percent (2020)	Percent (2016)
Stunted	7,756	18%	23%
Wasted	5,175	12%	16%
Severely wasted	2,564	6%	5%
Underweight	4,850	11%	25%
Overweight/obesity	2,837	7%	3%
Anemia	24,843	64%	76%
Total children	43,306		

The table below shows the district nutrition profile of SBS Nagar of women between the ages of 15 and 49 years, as of year 2020.

District nutritional profile of SBS Nagar of women of 15–49 years, in 2020
Indicators	Number of women (15–49 years)	Percent (2020)	Percent (2016)
Underweight (BMI <18.5 kg/m^2)	19,438	10%	13%
Overweight/obesity	83,294	42%	36%
Hypertension	65,252	33%	15%
Diabetes	30,124	15%	NA
Anemia (non-preg)	99,522	50%	65%
Anemia (preg)	NA	NA	58%
Total women (preg)	9,216		
Total women	199,363		

The table below shows the number of road accidents and people affected in SBS Nagar district by year.

Road accidents and people affected in SBS Nagar district by year
Year	Accidents	Killed	Injured	Vehicles Involved
2022	105	70	76	164
2021	188	163	59	147
2020	129	111	59	85
2019	153	128	66	87

== Politics ==
No.	Constituency	Name of MLA	Party	Bench
46	Banga (SC)	Sukhwinder Kumar Sukhi	Aam Aadmi Party	Government
47	Nawan Shahr	Nachhatar Pal	Bahujan Samaj Party	Opposition
48	Balachaur	Santosh Katariaa	Aam Aadmi Party	Government

== Notable residents ==
- Jazzy B, Indo-Canadian singer
- Amrish Puri, Indian actor
- Madan Puri, Indian actor
- Mohammed Zahur Khayyam, Indian music director
- Sukhshinder Shinda, Punjabi singer, music director, and producer
- Garry Sandhu, Punjabi Singer, Actor, Song Editor
- Inderjeet Singh, a shot put athlete and medalist in international games

== Villages ==
- Bakapur
- Barnala Kalan
- Bharoli
- Chak Alahi Bakhash
- Chak Dana
- Chak Mander
- Charan
- Chuharpur
- Jabbowal
- Jagatpur
- Jagatpur Ther
- Kanaun
- Saidpur Theh
- Raipur Daba

Karnana

- Kariam
- Khankhana
- Ladhian
- Lodhipur
- Muna
- Naura
- Ram Rai Pur

Pharala

- Sarhala Ranuan
