= Lovely Professional University =

Private state university in Punjab, India

- Other name: LPU
- Motto: "Transforming Education Transforming India"
- Type: Private
- Established: 2005
- Affiliations: UGC, AIU, PCI, NCTE, COA, ACBSP, ACU, ICAR, BCI,
- Chancellor: Ashok Kumar Mittal
- Vice-Chancellor: Jaspal Singh Sandhu
- Academic staff: 2066
- Students: 34,871 (2024)
- Location: Chaheru, Phagwara, Punjab, India (Note: The campus is situated in Chaheru of Phagwara Tehsil, 8km from Phagwara railway station.); 31.253609°N 75.70367°E
- Campus: 90 acres (36 ha) (Note: The campus is situated in Chaheru, Phagwara Punjab, Pincode 144411, a village. Therefore the campus falls under the rural category.); Rural
- Colours: Orange
- Website: www.lpu.in

Lovely Professional University (LPU) is a private university located in Chiheru, Phagwara, Punjab, India. Established under the Lovely Professional University Act, 2005, it commenced operations in 2006.

== Governance ==
The university's founder and chancellor is Ashok Kumar Mittal, with his wife Rashmi Mittal as the pro-chancellor.

== Academics ==
LPU has schools on various subjects including business, fashion design, engineering, law, education, agriculture, humanities, and tourism.

=== Affiliations ===
The Lovely Professional University is affiliated and recognised by national facilitators such as the University Grants Commission (UGC), the Pharmacy Council of India, and the Bar Council of India.

LPU's School of Agriculture is accredited by the Indian Council of Agricultural Research. It has accreditations and memberships of the National Board of Accreditation (NBA), Council of Architecture (CoA), and National Council for Teacher Education (NCTE).

LPU is a member of the Association of Commonwealth Universities. The distance education programmes are approved by the UGC's Distance Education Bureau.

== Rankings ==
University rankings

General – India
- NIRF (Overall) (2023): 46
- NIRF (Research) (2023): 42
- NIRF (Universities) (2023): 38

Engineering – India
- NIRF (2024): 50

Law – India
- NIRF (2023): 16

Business/Management – India
- NIRF (2024): 38

In the National Institutional Ranking Framework (NIRF) 2025, LPU secured the 49th position overall. NIRF ranked Lovely Professional University 31st among universities. It also ranked 44th in management, 13th in pharmacy, 48th in engineering, 26th in law and 24th in architecture ranking in India.

LPU ranked 501–600th band in the Times Higher Education World University Rankings, and 901-950 in QS World University Rankings in 2026.
