= Livelihood =

One's means of supporting one's self

A person's livelihood (derived from life-lode, "way of life"; cf. OG lib-leit) refers to their "means of securing the basic necessities (food, water, shelter and clothing) of life". Livelihood is defined as a set of activities essential to everyday life that are conducted over one's life span. Such activities could include securing water, food, fodder, medicine, shelter, clothing. An individual's livelihood involves the capacity to acquire aforementioned necessities in order to satisfy the basic needs of themselves and their household. The activities are usually carried out repeatedly and in a manner that is sustainable and providing of dignity. For instance, a fisherman's livelihood depends on the availability and accessibility of fish.

The concept of Sustainable Livelihood (SL) is an attempt to go beyond the conventional definitions and approaches to poverty eradication.

These had been found to be too narrow because they focused only on certain aspects or manifestations of poverty, such as low income, or did not consider other vital aspects of poverty such as vulnerability and social exclusion. It is now recognized that more attention must be paid to the various factors and processes which either constrain or enhance poor people's ability to make a living in an economically, ecologically, and socially sustainable manner.

The SL concept offers a more coherent and integrated approach to poverty. The sustainable livelihoods idea was first introduced by the Brundtland Commission on Environment and Development, and the 1992 United Nations Conference on Environment and Development expanded the concept, advocating for the achievement of sustainable livelihoods as a broad goal for poverty eradication.

In 1992 Robert Chambers and Gordon Conway proposed the following composite definition of a sustainable rural livelihood, which is applied most commonly at the household level: "A livelihood comprises the capabilities, assets (stores, resources, claims and access) and activities required for a means of living: a livelihood is sustainable which can cope with and recover from stress and shocks, maintain or enhance its capabilities and assets, and provide sustainable livelihood opportunities for the next generation; and which contributes net benefits to other livelihoods at the local and global levels and in the short and long term."

== In social sciences ==
In social sciences, the concept of livelihood extends to include social and cultural means, i.e. "the command an individual, family, or other social group has over an income and/or bundles of resources that can be used or exchanged to satisfy its needs. This may involve information, cultural knowledge, social networks and legal rights as well as tools, land and other physical resources."

The concept of livelihood is used in the fields such as political ecology in research that focuses on sustainability and human rights.

== Contributors to literature and practice ==
- Robert Chambers
- Ian Scoones
- Anthony Bebbington
- Lasse Krantz
- Per Knutsson
- Ruedi Hoegger
- Ruedi Baumgartner
- Smita Premchander
- K V Raju
- Vijay Mahajan
- G K Karanth
- V Ramaswamy
- Frank Ellis
- Dr. C. Shambu Prasad
- Dr. Girish G. Sohani i
- KS Gopal
- Madhukar Shukla
- Ajit Kanitkar
- Sankar Datta

== See also ==
- Right Livelihood Award
- Three Principles of the People#Mínshēng, a related concept in Chinese political economy
