= Patti Shahpur =

- Village
- Location in Punjab, India Patti Shahpur (India)
- Coordinates: 31.0503794°N 76.1980665°E
- Country: India
- State: Punjab
- District: Shaheed Bhagat Singh Nagar

Government
  - Type: Panchayat raj
  - Body: Gram panchayat
- Elevation: 355 m (1,165 ft)

Population (2011)
  - Total: 14
- Sex ratio 8/6 ♂/♀

Languages
  - Official: Punjabi
- Time zone: UTC+5:30 (IST)
- PIN: 144515
- Telephone code: 01823
- ISO 3166 code: IN-PB
- Post office: Sheikhepur Bagh (B.O)
- Website: nawanshahr.nic.in

Patti Shahpur is a village in Shaheed Bhagat Singh Nagar district of Punjab State, India. It is located 3.8 kilometres (2.4 mi) away from branch post office Sheikhepur Bagh, 13 kilometres (8.1 mi) from Nawanshahr, 20.4 kilometres (12.7 mi) from district headquarter Shaheed Bhagat Singh Nagar and 81.6 kilometres (50.7 mi) from state capital Chandigarh. The village is administrated by Sarpanch an elected representative of the village.

== Demography ==
As of 2011, Patti Shahpur has a total number of 4 houses and population of 14 of which 8 include are males while 6 are females according to the report published by Census India in 2011. The literacy rate of Patti Shahpur is 78.57% higher than the state average of 75.84%. The population of children under the age of 6 years is 0 which is 0% of total population of Patti Shahpur, and child sex ratio is approximately 0 as compared to Punjab state average of 846.

As per the report published by Census India in 2011, 9 people were engaged in work activities out of the total population of Patti Shahpur which includes 4 males and 5 females. According to census survey report 2011, 55.56% workers describe their work as main work and 44.44% workers are involved in Marginal activity providing livelihood for less than 6 months.

== Education ==
The village has a Punjabi medium, co-ed primary school established in 1964. The school provide mid-day meal as per Indian Midday Meal Scheme. As per Right of Children to Free and Compulsory Education Act the school provide free education to children between the ages of 6 and 14.

KC Engineering College and Doaba Khalsa Trust Group Of Institutions are the nearest colleges. Industrial Training Institute for women (ITI Nawanshahr) is 10 kilometres (6.2 mi). The village is 62 kilometres (39 mi) away from Chandigarh University, 39 kilometres (24 mi) from Indian Institute of Technology and 56 kilometres (35 mi) away from Lovely Professional University.

List of schools nearby:

- Govt Senior Secondary School, Ladhana Jhikka
- Dashmesh Model School, Kahma
- Govt High School, Jhander Kalan
- Govt Gigh School, Khan Khana
- Guru Ram Dass Public School, Cheta

== Transport ==
Nawanshahr train station is the nearest train station however, Garhshankar Junction railway station is 21 kilometres (13 mi) away from the village. Sahnewal Airport is the nearest domestic airport which located 58.8 kilometres (36.5 mi) away in Ludhiana and the nearest international airport is located in Chandigarh also Sri Guru Ram Dass Jee International Airport is the second nearest airport which is 165 kilometres (103 mi) away in Amritsar.

== See also ==
- List of villages in India
