= Mangowal, SBS Nagar =

Mangowal
- Village
- Location in Punjab, India Mangowal (India)
- Coordinates: 31.1499079°N 76.0325376°E
- Country: India
- State: Punjab
- District: Shaheed Bhagat Singh Nagar

Government
  - Type: Panchayat raj
  - Body: Gram panchayat
- Elevation: 251 m (823 ft)

Population (2011)
  - Total: 1,836
- Sex ratio 914/949 ♂/♀

Languages
  - Official: Punjabi
- Time zone: UTC+5:30 (IST)
- PIN: 144512
- Telephone code: 01884
- ISO 3166 code: IN-PB
- Post office: Kahma (S.O)
- Website: nawanshahr.nic.in

Mangowal is a village in Shaheed Bhagat Singh Nagar district of Punjab State, India. It is located 2.4 kilometres (1.5 mi) away from sub post office Kahma, 8.7 kilometres (5.4 mi) from Nawanshahr, 8.5 kilometres (5.3 mi) from district headquarter Shaheed Bhagat Singh Nagar and 99 kilometres (62 mi) from state capital Chandigarh. The village is administrated by Sarpanch an elected representative of the village.

== Demography ==
As of 2011, Mangowal has a total number of 393 houses and population of 1863 of which 914 include are males while 949 are females according to the report published by Census India in 2011. The literacy rate of Mangowal is 79.86%, higher than the state average of 75.84%. The population of children under the age of 6 years is 205 which is 11% of total population of Mangowal, and child sex ratio is approximately 1071 as compared to Punjab state average of 846.

Most of the people are from Schedule Caste which constitutes 40.53% of total population in Mangowal. The town does not have any Schedule Tribe population so far.

As per the report published by Census India in 2011, 560 people were engaged in work activities out of the total population of Mangowal which includes 515 males and 45 females. According to census survey report 2011, 90% workers describe their work as main work and 10% workers are involved in Marginal activity providing livelihood for less than 6 months.

== Education ==
The village has a Punjabi medium, co-ed primary school established in 1954. The school provide mid-day meal as per Indian Midday Meal Scheme. As per Right of Children to Free and Compulsory Education Act the school provide free education to children between the ages of 6 and 14.

Amardeep Singh Shergill Memorial college Mukandpur and Sikh National College Banga are the nearest colleges. Industrial Training Institute for women (ITI Nawanshahr) is 12.5 kilometres (7.8 mi) The village is 59 kilometres (37 mi) from Indian Institute of Technology and 38.5 kilometres (23.9 mi) away from Lovely Professional University.

List of schools nearby:

- Govt Senior Secondary School, Ladhana Jhikka
- Dashmesh Model School, Kahma
- Govt High School, Jhander Kalan
- Govt Gigh School, Khan Khana
- Guru Ram Dass Public School, Cheta

== Transport ==
Nawanshahr train station is the nearest train station however, Garhshankar Junction railway station is 19 kilometres (12 mi) away from the village. Sahnewal Airport is the nearest domestic airport which located 66 kilometres (41 mi) away in Ludhiana and the nearest international airport is located in Chandigarh also Sri Guru Ram Dass Jee International Airport is the second nearest airport which is 147 kilometres (91 mi) away in Amritsar.

== See also ==
- List of villages in India
