= Mander, SBS Nagar =

Mander
- Village
- Location in Punjab, India Mander (India)
- Coordinates: 31.1475112°N 75.9374785°E
- Country: India
- State: Punjab
- District: Shaheed Bhagat Singh Nagar

Government
  - Type: Panchayat raj
  - Body: Gram panchayat
- Elevation: 251 m (823 ft)

Population (2011)
  - Total: 602
- Sex ratio 307/295 ♂/♀

Languages
  - Official: Punjabi
- Time zone: UTC+5:30 (IST)
- PIN: 144509
- Telephone code: 01823
- ISO 3166 code: IN-PB
- Post office: Khan Khana (S.O)
- Website: nawanshahr.nic.in

Mander is a village in Shaheed Bhagat Singh Nagar district of Punjab State, India. It is located 6.5 kilometres (4.0 mi) away from sub post office Khan Khana, 25 kilometres (16 mi) from Nawanshahr, 16.5 kilometres (10.3 mi) from district headquarter Shaheed Bhagat Singh Nagar and 115 kilometres (71 mi) from state capital Chandigarh. The village is administrated by Sarpanch an elected representative of the village.

== Demography ==
As of 2011, Mander has a total number of 126 houses and population of 602 of which 307 include are males while 295 are females according to the report published by Census India in 2011. The literacy rate of Mander is 78.62%, higher than the state average of 75.84%. The population of children under the age of 6 years is 50 which is 8.31% of total population of Mander, and child sex ratio is approximately 724 as compared to Punjab state average of 846.

Most of the people are from Schedule Caste which constitutes 50.17% of total population in Mander. The town does not have any Schedule Tribe population so far.

As per the report published by Census India in 2011, 193 people were engaged in work activities out of the total population of Mander which includes 172 males and 21 females. According to census survey report 2011, 46.63% workers describe their work as main work and 53.37% workers are involved in Marginal activity providing livelihood for less than 6 months.

== Education ==
The village has a Punjabi medium, co-ed primary school. The school provide mid-day meal as per Indian Midday Meal Scheme. As per Right of Children to Free and Compulsory Education Act the school provide free education to children between the ages of 6 and 14.

Amardeep Singh Shergill Memorial college Mukandpur and Sikh National College Banga are the nearest colleges. Industrial Training Institute for women (ITI Nawanshahr) is 26 kilometres (16 mi) The village is 72 kilometres (45 mi) from Indian Institute of Technology and 33 kilometres (21 mi) away from Lovely Professional University.

List of schools nearby:

- Govt Senior Secondary School, Ladhana Jhikka
- Dashmesh Model School, Kahma
- Govt High School, Jhander Kalan
- Govt Gigh School, Khan Khana
- Guru Ram Dass Public School, Cheta

== Transport ==
Banga train station is the nearest train station however, Phagwara Junction railway station is 24 kilometres (15 mi) away from the village. Sahnewal Airport is the nearest domestic airport which located 53 kilometres (33 mi) away in Ludhiana and the nearest international airport is located in Chandigarh also Sri Guru Ram Dass Jee International Airport is the second nearest airport which is 141 kilometres (88 mi) away in Amritsar.

== See also ==
- List of villages in India
