= Lakhpur, SBS Nagar =

Lakhpur
- Village
- Location in Punjab, India Lakhpur (India)
- Coordinates: 31.1699589°N 75.9375966°E
- Country: India
- State: Punjab
- District: Shaheed Bhagat Singh Nagar

Government
  - Type: Panchayat raj
  - Body: Gram panchayat
- Elevation: 251 m (823 ft)

Population (2011)
  - Total: 836
- Sex ratio 404/432 ♂/♀

Languages
  - Official: Punjabi
- Time zone: UTC+5:30 (IST)
- PIN: 144509
- Telephone code: 01884
- ISO 3166 code: IN-PB
- Post office: Khan Khana
- Website: nawanshahr.nic.in

Lakhpur is a village in Shaheed Bhagat Singh Nagar district of Punjab State, India. It is located 3.1 kilometres (1.9 mi) away from postal head office Ladhana Jhikka, 21 kilometres (13 mi) from Nawanshahr, 16.5 kilometres (10.3 mi) from district headquarter Shaheed Bhagat Singh Nagar and 111 kilometres (69 mi) from state capital Chandigarh. The village is administrated by Sarpanch an elected representative of the village.

== Demography ==
As of 2011, Lakhpur has a total number of 189 houses and population of 836 of which 404 include are males while 432 are females according to the report published by Census India in 2011. The literacy rate of Lakhpur is 72.19%, lower than the state average of 75.84%. The population of children under the age of 6 years is 81 which is 9.69% of total population of Lakhpur, and child sex ratio is approximately 800 as compared to Punjab state average of 846.

Most of the people are from Schedule Caste which constitutes 71.53% of total population in Lakhpur. The town does not have any Schedule Tribe population so far.

As per the report published by Census India in 2011, 500 people were engaged in work activities out of the total population of Lakhpur which includes 266 males and 234 females. According to census survey report 2011, 31% workers describe their work as main work and 69% workers are involved in Marginal activity providing livelihood for less than 6 months.

Kalirai Jatt, of Lakhpur, have originated from.the village of Khankhana.

== Demography ==
As of 2011, Lakhpur has a total number of 189 houses and population of 836 of which 404 include are males while 432 are females according to the report published by Census India in 2011. The literacy rate of Lakhpur is 72.19%, lower than the state average of 75.84%. The population of children under the age of 6 years is 81 which is .

Most of the people are from Schedule Caste which constitutes 71.53% of total population in Lakhpur. The town does not have any Schedule Tribe population so far.

As per the report published by Census India in 2011, 500 people were engaged in work activities out of the total population of Lakhpur which includes 266 males and 234 females. According to census survey report 2011, 31% workers describe their work as main work and 69% workers are involved in Marginal activity providing livelihood for less than 6 months.

== Education ==
The village has a Punjabi medium, co-ed upper primary school established in 1966. The schools provide mid-day meal as per Indian Midday Meal Scheme. The school provide free education to children between the ages of 6 and 14 as per Right of Children to Free and Compulsory Education Act.

Amardeep Singh Shergill Memorial college Mukandpur and Sikh National College Banga are the nearest colleges. Industrial Training Institute for women (ITI Nawanshahr) is 22 kilometres (14 mi) The village is 69 kilometres (43 mi) from Indian Institute of Technology and 29 kilometres (18 mi) away from Lovely Professional University.

List of schools nearby:

- Govt Senior Secondary School, Ladhana Jhikka
- Dashmesh Model School, Kahma
- Govt High School, Jhander Kalan
- Govt Gigh School, Khan Khana
- Guru Ram Dass Public School, Cheta

== Transport ==
Banga railway station is the nearest train station, However, Garhshankar Junction train station is 24 kilometres (15 mi) away from the village. Sahnewal Airport is the nearest domestic airport located 57 kilometres (35 mi) away in Ludhiana and the nearest international airport is located in Chandigarh also Sri Guru Ram Dass Jee International Airport is the second nearest airport which is 137 kilometres (85 mi) away in Amritsar.

== See also ==
- List of villages in India
