= Palli Jhikki =

- Village
- Location in Punjab, India Palli Jhikki (India)
- Coordinates: 31.1894579°N 76.0769133°E
- Country: India
- State: Punjab
- District: Shaheed Bhagat Singh Nagar

Government
  - Type: Panchayat raj
  - Body: Gram panchayat

Population (2011)
  - Total: 1,892
- Sex ratio 970/922 ♂/♀

Languages
  - Official: Punjabi
- Time zone: UTC+5:30 (IST)
- PIN: 144512
- ISO 3166 code: IN-PB
- Post office: Kahma (S.O)
- Website: nawanshahr.nic.in

Palli Jhikki is a village in Shaheed Bhagat Singh Nagar district of Punjab State, India. It is located 9.5 kilometres (5.9 mi) away from sub post office Kahma, 10 kilometres (6.2 mi) from Nawanshahr, 17 kilometres (11 mi) from district headquarter Shaheed Bhagat Singh Nagar and 103 kilometres (64 mi) from state capital Chandigarh. The village is administrated by Sarpanch an elected representative of the village.

== Demography ==
As of 2011, Palli Jhikki has a total number of 411 houses and population of 1892 of which 970 include are males while 922 are females according to the report published by Census India in 2011. The literacy rate of Palli Jhikki is 79.76% higher than the state average of 75.84%. The population of children under the age of 6 years is 173 which is 9.14% of total population of Palli Jhikki, and child sex ratio is approximately 765 as compared to Punjab state average of 846.

Most of the people are from Schedule Caste which constitutes 43.45% of total population in Palli Jhikki. The town does not have any Schedule Tribe population so far.

As per the report published by Census India in 2011, 936 people were engaged in work activities out of the total population of Palli Jhikki which includes 583 males and 353 females. According to census survey report 2011, 77.88% workers describe their work as main work and 22.12% workers are involved in Marginal activity providing livelihood for less than 6 months.

== Education ==
The village has a Punjabi medium, co-ed upper primary with secondary/higher secondary school established in 1975. and a primary school established in 1994. The schools provide mid-day meal as per Indian Midday Meal Scheme. As per Right of Children to Free and Compulsory Education Act the school provide free education to children between the ages of 6 and 14.

Amardeep Singh Shergill Memorial college Mukandpur, KC Engineering College and Doaba Khalsa Trust Group Of Institutions are the nearest colleges. Industrial Training Institute for women (ITI Nawanshahr) is 10.8 kilometres (6.7 mi). The village is 84 kilometres (52 mi) away from Chandigarh University, 61 kilometres (38 mi) from Indian Institute of Technology and 39 kilometres (24 mi) away from Lovely Professional University.

List of schools nearby:

- Guru Gobind Singh Public School, Palli Jhikki (Primary with Upper Primary)
- Govt Senior Secondary School, Ladhana Jhikka
- Dashmesh Model School, Kahma
- Govt High School, Jhander Kalan
- Govt Gigh School, Khan Khana
- Guru Ram Dass Public School, Cheta

== Transport ==
Nawanshahr train station is the nearest train station however, Garhshankar Junction railway station is 8.7 kilometres (5.4 mi) away from the village. Sahnewal Airport is the nearest domestic airport which located 65 kilometres (40 mi) away in Ludhiana and the nearest international airport is located in Chandigarh also Sri Guru Ram Dass Jee International Airport is the second nearest airport which is 148 kilometres (92 mi) away in Amritsar.

== See also ==
- List of villages in India
