= Pandrawal =

- Village
- Location in Punjab, India Pandrawal (India)
- Coordinates: 31.0234161°N 75.9539151°E
- Country: India
- State: Punjab
- District: Shaheed Bhagat Singh Nagar

Government
  - Type: Panchayat raj
  - Body: Gram panchayat
- Elevation: 254 m (833 ft)

Population (2011)
  - Total: 707
- Sex ratio 372/335 ♂/♀

Languages
  - Official: Punjabi
- Time zone: UTC+5:30 (IST)
- PIN: 144515
- Telephone code: 01823
- ISO 3166 code: IN-PB
- Post office: Lassara (S.O)
- Website: nawanshahr.nic.in

Pandrawal is a village in Shaheed Bhagat Singh Nagar district of Punjab State, India. It is located 3.6 kilometres (2.2 mi) away from sub post office Lassara, 21 kilometres (13 mi) from Nawanshahr, 14 kilometres (8.7 mi) from district headquarter Shaheed Bhagat Singh Nagar and 110 kilometres (68 mi) from state capital Chandigarh. The village is administrated by Sarpanch an elected representative of the village.

== Demography ==
As of 2011, Pandrawal has a total number of 122 houses and population of 707 of which 372 include are males while 335 are females according to the report published by Census India in 2011. The literacy rate of Pandrawal is 67.63% lower than the state average of 75.84%. The population of children under the age of 6 years is 83 which is 11.74% of total population of Pandrawal, and child sex ratio is approximately 886 as compared to Punjab state average of 846.

Most of the people are from Schedule Caste which constitutes 7.50% of total population in Pandrawal. The town does not have any Schedule Tribe population so far.

As per the report published by Census India in 2011, 238 people were engaged in work activities out of the total population of Pandrawal which includes 207 males and 31 females. According to census survey report 2011, 97.48% workers describe their work as main work and 2.52% workers are involved in Marginal activity providing livelihood for less than 6 months.

== Education ==
The village has a Punjabi medium, co-ed primary school established in 1953 and an upper primary school. The schools provide mid-day meal as per Indian Midday Meal Scheme. As per Right of Children to Free and Compulsory Education Act the school provide free education to children between the ages of 6 and 14.

KC Engineering College and Doaba Khalsa Trust Group Of Institutions are the nearest colleges. Industrial Training Institute for women (ITI Nawanshahr) is 23 kilometres (14 mi). The village is 86 kilometres (53 mi) away from Chandigarh University, 68 kilometres (42 mi) from Indian Institute of Technology and 51 kilometres (32 mi) away from Lovely Professional University.

List of schools nearby:

- Govt Senior Secondary School, Ladhana Jhikka
- Dashmesh Model School, Kahma
- Govt High School, Jhander Kalan
- Govt Gigh School, Khan Khana
- Guru Ram Dass Public School, Cheta

== Transport ==
Phagwara train station is the nearest train station however, Garhshankar Junction railway station is 38 kilometres (24 mi) away from the village. Sahnewal Airport is the nearest domestic airport which located 48.8 kilometres (30.3 mi) away in Ludhiana and the nearest international airport is located in Chandigarh also Sri Guru Ram Dass Jee International Airport is the second nearest airport which is 160 kilometres (99 mi) away in Amritsar.

== See also ==
- List of villages in India
