= Pallian Khurd =

- Village
- Location in Punjab, India Pallian Khurd (India)
- Coordinates: 31.070088°N 76.1447596°E
- Country: India
- State: Punjab
- District: Shaheed Bhagat Singh Nagar

Government
  - Type: Panchayat raj
  - Body: Gram panchayat
- Elevation: 355 m (1,165 ft)

Population (2011)
  - Total: 1,153
- Sex ratio 588/565 ♂/♀

Languages
  - Official: Punjabi
- Time zone: UTC+5:30 (IST)
- PIN: 144517
- Telephone code: 01823
- ISO 3166 code: IN-PB
- Post office: Kot Ranjha (B.O)
- Website: nawanshahr.nic.in

Pallian Khurd is a village in Shaheed Bhagat Singh Nagar district of Punjab State, India. It is located 1 kilometre (0.62 mi) away from branch post office Kot Ranjha, 11 kilometres (6.8 mi) from Nawanshahr, 13.7 kilometres (8.5 mi) from district headquarter Shaheed Bhagat Singh Nagar and 87.9 kilometres (54.6 mi) from state capital Chandigarh. The village is administrated by a Sarpanch, an elected representative of the village.

== Demography ==
As of 2011, Pallian Khurd has a total number of 233 houses and a population of 1153 of which 588 are males while 565 are females according to the report published by Census India in 2011. The literacy rate of Pallian Khurd is 76.74% higher than the state average of 75.84%. The population of children under the age of 6 years is 117 which is 10.15% of the total population of Pallian Khurd, and child sex ratio is approximately 800 as compared to the Punjab state average of 846.

Most of the people are from Schedule Caste which constitutes 36.43% of the total population in Pallian Khurd. The town does not have any Schedule Tribe population so far.

As per the report published by Census India in 2011, 570 people were engaged in work activities of the total population of Pallian Khurd which includes 330 males and 240 females. According to a census survey report in 2011, 77.89% of workers describe their work as main work, and 22.11% of workers are involved in Marginal activity providing livelihood for less than 6 months.

== Education ==
KC Engineering College and Doaba Khalsa Trust Group Of Institutions are the nearest colleges. Industrial Training Institute for women (ITI Nawanshahr) is 7.2 kilometres (4.5 mi). The village is 70.6 kilometres (43.9 mi) away from Chandigarh University, 45.7 kilometres (28.4 mi) from Indian Institute of Technology and 52.5 kilometres (32.6 mi) away from Lovely Professional University.

List of schools nearby:

- Govt Primary School, Pallian Kalan
- Govt Senior Secondary School, Ladhana Jhikka
- Dashmesh Model School, Kahma
- Govt High School, Jhander Kalan
- Govt Gigh School, Khan Khana
- Guru Ram Dass Public School, Cheta

== Transport ==
Nawanshahr train station is the nearest train station however, Garhshankar Junction railway station is 20.3 kilometres (12.6 mi) away from the village. Sahnewal Airport is the nearest domestic airport which located 52 kilometres (32 mi) away in Ludhiana and the nearest international airport is located in Chandigarh also Sri Guru Ram Dass Jee International Airport is the second nearest airport which is 162 kilometres (101 mi) away in Amritsar.

== See also ==
- List of villages in India
