= Nurpur, SBS Nagar =

Nurpur
- Village
- Location in Punjab, India Nurpur (India)
- Coordinates: 31.1608887°N 75.9064454°E
- Country: India
- State: Punjab
- District: Shaheed Bhagat Singh Nagar

Government
  - Type: Panchayat raj
  - Body: Gram panchayat
- Elevation: 254 m (833 ft)

Population (2011)
  - Total: 998
- Sex ratio 512/486 ♂/♀

Languages
  - Official: Punjabi
- Time zone: UTC+5:30 (IST)
- PIN: 144502
- Telephone code: 01823
- ISO 3166 code: IN-PB
- Post office: Sarhal Qazian (B.O)
- Website: nawanshahr.nic.in

Nurpur is a village in Shaheed Bhagat Singh Nagar district of Punjab State, India. It is located 1.1 kilometres (0.68 mi) away from branch post office Sarhal Qazian, 27 kilometres (17 mi) from Nawanshahr, 22 kilometres (14 mi) from district headquarter Shaheed Bhagat Singh Nagar and 117 kilometres (73 mi) from state capital Chandigarh. The village is administrated by Sarpanch an elected representative of the village.

== Demography ==
As of 2011, Nurpur has a total number of 231 houses and population of 998 of which 512 include are males while 486 are females according to the report published by Census India in 2011. The literacy rate of Nurpur is 75.99% higher than the state average of 75.84%. The population of children under the age of 6 years is 86 which is 8.62% of total population of Nurpur, and child sex ratio is approximately 911 as compared to Punjab state average of 846.

Most of the people are from Schedule Caste which constitutes 50.60% of total population in Nurpur. The town does not have any Schedule Tribe population so far.

As per the report published by Census India in 2011, 365 people were engaged in work activities out of the total population of Nurpur which includes 325 males and 40 females. According to census survey report 2011, 81.37% workers describe their work as main work and 18.63% workers are involved in Marginal activity providing livelihood for less than 6 months.

== Education ==
The village has a Punjabi medium, co-ed upper primary school established in 1996. The school provide mid-day meal as per Indian Midday Meal Scheme. As per Right of Children to Free and Compulsory Education Act the school provide free education to children between the ages of 6 and 14.

Amardeep Singh Shergill Memorial college Mukandpur, KC Engineering College and Doaba Khalsa Trust Group Of Institutions are the nearest colleges. Industrial Training Institute for women (ITI Nawanshahr) is 27 kilometres (17 mi). The village is 102 kilometres (63 mi) away from Chandigarh University, 97 kilometres (60 mi) from Indian Institute of Technology and 27 kilometres (17 mi) away from Lovely Professional University.

List of schools nearby:

- Govt Senior Secondary School, Ladhana Jhikka
- Dashmesh Model School, Kahma
- Govt High School, Jhander Kalan
- Govt Gigh School, Khan Khana
- Guru Ram Dass Public School, Cheta

== Transport ==
Banga train station is the nearest train station however, Phagwara Junction railway station is 20 kilometres (12 mi) away from the village. Sahnewal Airport is the nearest domestic airport which located 52 kilometres (32 mi) away in Ludhiana and the nearest international airport is located in Chandigarh also Sri Guru Ram Dass Jee International Airport is the second nearest airport which is 136 kilometres (85 mi) away in Amritsar.

== See also ==
- List of villages in India
