= Kangraur =

- Village
- Location in Punjab, India Kangraur (India)
- Coordinates: 31.2643095°N 75.9234129°E
- Country: India
- State: Punjab
- District: Shaheed Bhagat Singh Nagar

Government
  - Type: Panchayat raj
  - Body: Gram panchayat
- Elevation: 251 m (823 ft)

Population (2011)
  - Total: 1,695
- Sex ratio 867/828 ♂/♀

Languages
  - Official: Punjabi
- Time zone: UTC+5:30 (IST)
- PIN: 144503
- Telephone code: 01823
- ISO 3166 code: IN-PB
- Post office: Pharala
- Website: nawanshahr.nic.in

Kangraur is a village in Shaheed Bhagat Singh Nagar district of Punjab State, India. It is located 8.8 kilometres (5.5 mi) away from postal head office Pharala, 11 km from town Banga, 26 kilometres (16 mi) from Nawanshahr, 23 kilometres (14 mi) from district headquarter Shaheed Bhagat Singh Nagar and 116 kilometres (72 mi) from state capital Chandigarh. The village is administrated by Sarpanch an elected representative of the village.

== Demography ==
As of 2011, Kangraur has a total number of 330 houses and population of 1695 of which 867 include are males while 828 are females according to the report published by Census India in 2011. The literacy rate of Kangraur is 82.96%, higher than the state average of 75.84%. The population of children under the age of 6 years is 193 which is 11.39% of total population of Kangraur, and child sex ratio is approximately 636 as compared to Punjab state average of 846.

Most of the people are from Schedule Caste which constitutes 36.58% of total population in Kangraur. The town does not have any Schedule Tribe population so far.

As per the report published by Census India in 2011, 504 people were engaged in work activities out of the total population of Kangraur which includes 469 males and 35 females. According to census survey report 2011, 91.47% workers describe their work as main work and 8.53% workers are involved in Marginal activity providing livelihood for less than 6 months.

== Education ==
The village has a Punjabi medium, co-ed upper primary with secondary school established in 1981. The school provide mid-day meal as per Indian Midday Meal Scheme. As per Right of Children to Free and Compulsory Education Act the school provide free education to children between the ages of 6 and 14.

Amardeep Singh Shergill Memorial college Mukandpur and Sikh National College Banga are the nearest colleges. Lovely Professional University is 32 kilometres (20 mi) away from the village.

List of schools nearby:

- Dashmesh Model School, Kahma
- Govt High School, Jhander Kalan
- Govt High School, Khan Khana
- Guru Teg Bahadur Model School, Behram
- Guru Ram Dass Public School, Cheta
- Lovely Public School, Pathlawa

== Transport ==
Banga railway station is the nearest train station however, Garhshankar Junction railway station is 25 kilometres (16 mi) away from the village. Sahnewal Airport is the nearest domestic airport which located 74 kilometres (46 mi) away in Ludhiana and the nearest international airport is located in Chandigarh also Sri Guru Ram Dass Jee International Airport is the second nearest airport which is 141 kilometres (88 mi) away in Amritsar.

== See also ==
- List of villages in India
