= Pallian Kalan =

- Village
- Location in Punjab, India Pallian Kalan (India)
- Coordinates: 31.0668899°N 76.1493516°E
- Country: India
- State: Punjab
- District: Shaheed Bhagat Singh Nagar

Government
  - Type: Panchayat raj
  - Body: Gram panchayat
- Elevation: 355 m (1,165 ft)

Population (2011)
  - Total: 594
- Sex ratio 308/286 ♂/♀

Languages
  - Official: Punjabi
- Time zone: UTC+5:30 (IST)
- PIN: 144517
- Telephone code: 01823
- ISO 3166 code: IN-PB
- Post office: Kot Ranjha (B.O)
- Website: nawanshahr.nic.in

Pallian Kalan is a village in Shaheed Bhagat Singh Nagar district of Punjab State, India. It is located 1.7 kilometres (1.1 mi) away from branch post office Kot Ranjha, 11.8 kilometres (7.3 mi) from Nawanshahr, 12.7 kilometres (7.9 mi) from district headquarter Shaheed Bhagat Singh Nagar and 87 kilometres (54 mi) from state capital Chandigarh. The village is administrated by Sarpanch an elected representative of the village.

== Demography ==
As of 2011, Pallian Kalan has a total number of 123 houses and population of 594 of which 308 include are males while 286 are females according to the report published by Census India in 2011. The literacy rate of Pallian Kalan is 77.95% higher than the state average of 75.84%. The population of children under the age of 6 years is 68 which is 11.45% of total population of Pallian Kalan, and child sex ratio is approximately 1000 as compared to Punjab state average of 846.

Most of the people are from Schedule Caste which constitutes 38.55% of total population in Pallian Kalan. The town does not have any Schedule Tribe population so far.

As per the report published by Census India in 2011, 333 people were engaged in work activities out of the total population of Pallian Kalan which includes 166 males and 167 females. According to census survey report 2011, 96.70% workers describe their work as main work and 3.30% workers are involved in Marginal activity providing livelihood for less than 6 months.

== Education ==
The village has a Punjabi medium, co-ed upper primary school established in 1974. The school provide mid-day meal as per Indian Midday Meal Scheme. As per Right of Children to Free and Compulsory Education Act the school provide free education to children between the ages of 6 and 14.

KC Engineering College and Doaba Khalsa Trust Group Of Institutions are the nearest colleges. Industrial Training Institute for women (ITI Nawanshahr) is 8.8 kilometres (5.5 mi). The village is 70.6 kilometres (43.9 mi) away from Chandigarh University, 44.8 kilometres (27.8 mi) from Indian Institute of Technology and 55.4 kilometres (34.4 mi) away from Lovely Professional University.

List of schools nearby:

- Govt Senior Secondary School, Ladhana Jhikka
- Dashmesh Model School, Kahma
- Govt High School, Jhander Kalan
- Govt Gigh School, Khan Khana
- Guru Ram Dass Public School, Cheta

== Transport ==
Nawanshahr train station is the nearest train station however, Garhshankar Junction railway station is 23 kilometres (14 mi) away from the village. Sahnewal Airport is the nearest domestic airport which located 52 kilometres (32 mi) away in Ludhiana and the nearest international airport is located in Chandigarh also Sri Guru Ram Dass Jee International Airport is the second nearest airport which is 164 kilometres (102 mi) away in Amritsar.

== See also ==
- List of villages in India
