= Paddi Matwali =

- Village
- Location in Punjab, India Paddi Matwali (India)
- Coordinates: 31.2226197°N 76.0010929°E
- Country: India
- State: Punjab
- District: Shaheed Bhagat Singh Nagar

Government
  - Type: Panchayat raj
  - Body: Gram panchayat
- Elevation: 251 m (823 ft)

Population (2011)
  - Total: 1,408
- Sex ratio 714/694 ♂/♀

Languages
  - Official: Punjabi
- Time zone: UTC+5:30 (IST)
- PIN: 144510
- Telephone code: 01823
- ISO 3166 code: IN-PB
- Post office: Ladhana Jhikka (S.O)
- Website: nawanshahr.nic.in

Paddi Matwali is a village in Shaheed Bhagat Singh Nagar district of Punjab State, India. It is located 2.5 kilometres (1.6 mi) away from sub post office Ladhana Jhikka, 19 kilometres (12 mi) from Nawanshahr, 17 kilometres (11 mi) from district headquarter Shaheed Bhagat Singh Nagar and 109 kilometres (68 mi) from state capital Chandigarh. The village is administrated by Sarpanch an elected representative of the village.

== Demography ==
As of 2011, Paddi Matwali has a total number of 312 houses and population of 1408 of which 714 include are males while 694 are females according to the report published by Census India in 2011. The literacy rate of Paddi Matwali is 82.58% higher than the state average of 75.84%. The population of children under the age of 6 years is 139 which is 9.87% of total population of Paddi Matwali, and child sex ratio is approximately 986 as compared to Punjab state average of 846.

Most of the people are from Schedule Caste which constitutes 54.05% of total population in Paddi Matwali. The town does not have any Schedule Tribe population so far.

As per the report published by Census India in 2011, 476 people were engaged in work activities out of the total population of Paddi Matwali which includes 404 males and 72 females. According to census survey report 2011, 69.07% workers describe their work as main work and 31.93% workers are involved in Marginal activity providing livelihood for less than 6 months.

== Education ==
Amardeep Singh Shergill Memorial college Mukandpur, KC Engineering College and Doaba Khalsa Trust Group Of Institutions are the nearest colleges. Industrial Training Institute for women (ITI Nawanshahr) is 20 kilometres (12 mi). The village is 90 kilometres (56 mi) away from Chandigarh University, 67 kilometres (42 mi) from Indian Institute of Technology and 35 kilometres (22 mi) away from Lovely Professional University.

List of schools nearby:

- Govt Senior Secondary School, Ladhana Jhikka
- Dashmesh Model School, Kahma
- Govt High School, Jhander Kalan
- Govt Gigh School, Khan Khana
- Guru Ram Dass Public School, Cheta

== Transport ==
Banga train station is the nearest train station however, Phagwara Junction railway station is 28 kilometres (17 mi) away from the village. Sahnewal Airport is the nearest domestic airport which located 64 kilometres (40 mi) away in Ludhiana and the nearest international airport is located in Chandigarh also Sri Guru Ram Dass Jee International Airport is the second nearest airport which is 144 kilometres (89 mi) away in Amritsar.

== See also ==
- List of villages in India
