= Palli Uchi =

- Village
- Location in Punjab, India Palli Uchi (India)
- Coordinates: 31.1807476°N 76.0815265°E
- Country: India
- State: Punjab
- District: Shaheed Bhagat Singh Nagar

Government
  - Type: Panchayat raj
  - Body: Gram panchayat
- Elevation: 355 m (1,165 ft)

Population (2011)
  - Total: 1,239
- Sex ratio 602/637 ♂/♀

Languages
  - Official: Punjabi
- Time zone: UTC+5:30 (IST)
- PIN: 144512
- Telephone code: 01823
- ISO 3166 code: IN-PB
- Post office: Kahma (S.O)
- Website: nawanshahr.nic.in

Palli Uchi is a village in Shaheed Bhagat Singh Nagar district of Punjab State, India. It is located 5.4 kilometres (3.4 mi) away from branch post office Kahma, 9.2 kilometres (5.7 mi) from Nawanshahr, 13 kilometres (8.1 mi) from district headquarter Shaheed Bhagat Singh Nagar and 103 kilometres (64 mi) from state capital Chandigarh. The village is administrated by Sarpanch an elected representative of the village.

== Demography ==
As of 2011, Palli Uchi has a total number of 284 houses and population of 1239 of which 602 include are males while 637 are females according to the report published by Census India in 2011. The literacy rate of Palli Uchi is 75.40% lower than the state average of 75.84%. The population of children under the age of 6 years is 125 which is 10.09% of total population of Palli Uchi, and child sex ratio is approximately 1193 as compared to Punjab state average of 846.

Most of the people are from Schedule Caste which constitutes 49.39% of total population in Palli Uchi. The town does not have any Schedule Tribe population so far.

As per the report published by Census India in 2011, 369 people were engaged in work activities out of the total population of Palli Uchi which includes 283 males and 86 females. According to census survey report 2011, 76.42% workers describe their work as main work and 23.58% workers are involved in Marginal activity providing livelihood for less than 6 months.

== Education ==
Amardeep Singh Shergill Memorial college Mukandpur, KC Engineering College and Doaba Khalsa Trust Group Of Institutions are the nearest colleges. Industrial Training Institute for women (ITI Nawanshahr) is 9.8 kilometres (6.1 mi). The village is 84 kilometres (52 mi) away from Chandigarh University, 61.3 kilometres (38.1 mi) from Indian Institute of Technology and 39.6 kilometres (24.6 mi) away from Lovely Professional University.

List of schools nearby:

- Govt Senior Secondary School, Ladhana Jhikka
- Dashmesh Model School, Kahma
- Govt High School, Jhander Kalan
- Govt Gigh School, Khan Khana
- Guru Ram Dass Public School, Cheta

== Transport ==
Banga train station is the nearest train station however, Phagwara Junction railway station is 8.7 kilometres (5.4 mi) away from the village. Sahnewal Airport is the nearest domestic airport which located 64 kilometres (40 mi) away in Ludhiana and the nearest international airport is located in Chandigarh also Sri Guru Ram Dass Jee International Airport is the second nearest airport which is 149 kilometres (93 mi) away in Amritsar.

== See also ==
- List of villages in India
