= Phul Makauri =

- Village
- Location in Punjab, India Phul Makauri (India)
- Coordinates: 31.0054675°N 76.1675262°E
- Country: India
- State: Punjab
- District: Shaheed Bhagat Singh Nagar

Government
  - Type: Panchayat raj
  - Body: Gram panchayat

Population (2011)
  - Total: 104
- Sex ratio 50/54 ♂/♀

Languages
  - Official: Punjabi
- Time zone: UTC+5:30 (IST)
- PIN: 144517
- ISO 3166 code: IN-PB
- Post office: Bahloor Kalan (B.O)
- Website: nawanshahr.nic.in

Phul Makauri is a village in Shaheed Bhagat Singh Nagar district of Punjab State, India. It is located 1.3 kilometres (0.81 mi) away from branch post office Bahloor Kalan, 19.2 kilometres (11.9 mi) from Nawanshahr, 20.2 kilometres (12.6 mi) from district headquarter Shaheed Bhagat Singh Nagar and 85.5 kilometres (53.1 mi) from state capital Chandigarh. The village is administrated by Sarpanch an elected representative of the village.

== Demography ==
As of 2011, Phul Makauri has a total number of 22 houses and a population of 104 of which 50 include are males while 54 are females according to the report published by Census India in 2011. The literacy rate of Phul Makauri is 70.21% lower than the state average of 75.84%. The population of children under the age of 6 years is 10 which is 9.62% of total population of Phul Makauri, and the child sex ratio is approximately 1000 as compared to the Punjab state average of 846.

Most of the people are from Schedule Caste which constitutes 71.15% of total population in Phul Makauri. The town does not have any Schedule Tribe population so far.

As per the report published by Census India in 2011, 28 people were engaged in work activities out of the total population of Phul Makauri which includes 28 males and 0 females. According to census survey report 2011, 100% workers describe their work as main work and 0% workers are involved in Marginal activity providing livelihood for less than 6 months.

== Education ==
KC Engineering College and Doaba Khalsa Trust Group Of Institutions are the nearest colleges. Industrial Training Institute for women (ITI Nawanshahr) is 20 kilometres (12 mi). The village is 61 kilometres (38 mi) away from Chandigarh University, 57 kilometres (35 mi) from Indian Institute of Technology and 62 kilometres (39 mi) away from Lovely Professional University.

List of schools nearby:

- Govt Senior Secondary School, Ladhana Jhikka
- Dashmesh Model School, Kahma
- Govt High School, Jhander Kalan
- Govt Gigh School, Khan Khana
- Guru Ram Dass Public School, Cheta

== Transport ==
Nawanshahr train station is the nearest train station however, Garhshankar Junction railway station is 30.6 kilometres (19.0 mi) away from the village. Sahnewal Airport is the nearest domestic airport which located 43 kilometres (27 mi) away in Ludhiana and the nearest international airport is located in Chandigarh also Sri Guru Ram Dass Jee International Airport is the second nearest airport which is 172 kilometres (107 mi) away in Amritsar.

== See also ==
- List of villages in India
