= Poonian =

- Village
- Location in Punjab, India Poonian (India)
- Coordinates: 31.1738071°N 75.9872642°E
- Country: India
- State: Punjab
- District: Shaheed Bhagat Singh Nagar

Government
  - Type: Panchayat raj
  - Body: Gram panchayat

Population (2011)
  - Total: 942
- Sex ratio 492/450 ♂/♀

Languages
  - Official: Punjabi
- Time zone: UTC+5:30 (IST)
- PIN: 144505
- ISO 3166 code: IN-PB
- Post office: Banga (S.O)
- Website: nawanshahr.nic.in

Poonian is a rural village that in the Shaheed Bhagat Singh Nagar district of Punjab, India. The village is represented through a sarpanch (a representative that is elected by the village people).

The village is 16 kilometres (9.9 mi) from Nawanshahr and 106 kilometres (66 mi) from Chandigarh.

== Demography ==
As of the 2011 census, Poonian has a total of 206 houses and a population of 942, of whom 492 are males. The literacy rate of Poonian is 75.30%. Of the total population, 11.89% are children under the age of 6 years. The child sex ratio is approximately 0.836 female/male, as compared to Punjab state average of 0.846 female/male.

17.2% of Poonian residents belong to a scheduled caste, while 82.8% belong to a scheduled tribe.

314 people (278 males and 36 females) were engaged in work activities. 89.49% workers describe their work as main work and 10.51% workers are involved in marginal activity providing livelihood for less than 6 months.

== Education ==
The village is 86.7 kilometres (53.9 mi) away from Chandigarh University, 63 kilometres (39 mi) away from Indian Institute of Technology, 31.5 kilometres (19.6 mi) away from Lovely Professional University, and 16.7 kilometres (10.4 mi) from Industrial Training Institute Nawanshahr.

Nearby schools include:

- Govt Senior Secondary School, Ladhana Jhikka
- Dashmesh Model School, Kahma
- Govt High School, Jhander Kalan
- Govt Gigh School, Khan Khana
- Guru Ram Dass Public School, Cheta

== Transport ==
The nearest train station is in Banga. Garhshankar junction railway station is 18 kilometres (11 mi) away from the village. Sahnewal Airport is the nearest domestic airport, and is 51 kilometres (32 mi) from Poonian. The nearest international airport is Sri Guru Ram Dass Jee International Airport, at 141 kilometres (88 mi) away.

== See also ==
- List of villages in India
