= Lidhar Kalan =

- Village
- Location in Punjab, India Lidhar Kalan (India)
- Coordinates: 31.1442265°N 75.901924°E
- Country: India
- State: Punjab
- District: Shaheed Bhagat Singh Nagar

Government
  - Type: Panchayat raj
  - Body: Gram panchayat
- Elevation: 254 m (833 ft)

Population (2011)
  - Total: 976
- Sex ratio 497/479 ♂/♀

Languages
  - Official: Punjabi
- Time zone: UTC+5:30 (IST)
- PIN: 144505
- Telephone code: 01823
- ISO 3166 code: IN-PB
- Post office: Dosanjh Kalan
- Website: nawanshahr.nic.in

Lidhar Kalan is a village in Shaheed Bhagat Singh Nagar district of Punjab State, India. It is located 8.6 kilometres (5.3 mi) away from postal head office Dosanjh Kalan, 27 kilometres (17 mi) from Nawanshahr, 18.7 kilometres (11.6 mi) from district headquarter Shaheed Bhagat Singh Nagar and 120 kilometres (75 mi) from state capital Chandigarh. The village is administrated by Sarpanch, an elected representative of the village.

== Demography ==
As of 2011, Lidhar Kalan has a total number of 223 houses and population of 976 of which 497 include are males while 479 are females according to the report published by Census India in 2011. The literacy rate of Lidhar Kalan is 81.05%, higher than the state average of 75.84%. The population of children under the age of 6 years is 79 which is 8.9% of total population of Lidhar Kalan, and child sex ratio is approximately 927 as compared to Punjab state average of 846.

Most of the people are from Schedule Caste which constitutes 54.30% of total population in Lidhar Kalan. The town does not have any Schedule Tribe population so far.

As per the report published by Census India in 2011, 332 people were engaged in work activities out of the total population of Lidhar Kalan which includes 283 males and 49 females. According to census survey report 2011, 82.83% of workers describe their work as main work and 17.17% workers are involved in Marginal activity providing livelihood for less than 6 months.

== Education ==
Amardeep Singh Shergill Memorial college Mukandpur and Sikh National College Banga are the nearest colleges. Industrial Training Institute for women (ITI Nawanshahr) is 30 kilometres (19 mi) The village is 77 kilometres (48 mi) from Indian Institute of Technology and 26 kilometres (16 mi) away from Lovely Professional University.

List of schools nearby:

- Govt Senior Secondary School, Ladhana Jhikka
- Dashmesh Model School, Kahma
- Govt High School, Jhander Kalan
- Govt Gigh School, Khan Khana
- Guru Ram Dass Public School, Cheta

== Transport ==
Behram railway station is the nearest train station, However, Phagwara Junction train station is 17 kilometres (11 mi) away from the village. Sahnewal Airport is the nearest domestic airport located 51 kilometres (32 mi) away in Ludhiana and the nearest international airport is located in Chandigarh also Sri Guru Ram Dass Jee International Airport is the second nearest airport which is 134 kilometres (83 mi) away in Amritsar.

== See also ==
- List of villages in India
