= Kajla =

- Village
- Location in Punjab, India Kajla (India)
- Coordinates: 31.2026801°N 75.9996946°E
- Country: India
- State: Punjab
- District: Shaheed Bhagat Singh Nagar

Government
  - Type: Panchayat raj
  - Body: Gram panchayat
- Elevation: 251 m (823 ft)

Population (2011)
  - Total: 1,033
- Sex ratio 507/526 ♂/♀

Languages
  - Official: Punjabi
- Time zone: UTC+5:30 (IST)
- PIN: 144505
- Telephone code: 01884
- ISO 3166 code: IN-PB
- Post office: Banga
- Website: nawanshahr.nic.in

Kajla is a village in Shaheed Bhagat Singh Nagar district of Punjab State, India. It is located 3 kilometres (1.9 mi) away from the postal head office in Banga, 16 kilometres (9.9 mi) from Nawanshahr, 15 kilometres (9.3 mi) from district headquarters Shaheed Bhagat Singh Nagar and 106 kilometres (66 mi) from state capital Chandigarh. The village is administrated by a Sarpanch an elected representative of the village.

== Demography ==
As of 2011, Kajla has a total number of 224 houses and a population of 1033 of which 507 are males while 526 are females according to the report published by Census India in 2011. The literacy rate of Kajla is 81.90%, higher than the state average of 75.84%. The population of children under the age of 6 years is 105 which is 10.16% of the total population of Kajla, and the child sex ratio is approximately 875 as compared to the Punjab state average of 846.

Most of the people are from Schedule Caste which constitutes 58.28% of the total population in Kajla. The town does not have any Schedule Tribe population so far.

As per the report published by Census India in 2011, 275 people were engaged in work activities of the total population of Kajla which includes 252 males and 23 females. According to a census survey report in 2011, 98.18% of workers describe their work as main work and 1.82% of workers are involved in Marginal activity providing a livelihood for less than 6 months.

== Education ==
The village has a Punjabi medium, co-ed primary school founded in 1953. The school provide mid-day meal as per the Indian Midday Meal Scheme. As per the Right of Children to Free and Compulsory Education Act the school provide free education to children between the ages of 6 and 14.

Amardeep Singh Shergill Memorial college Mukandpur and Sikh National College Banga are the nearest colleges. Lovely Professional University is 33 kilometres (21 mi) away from the village.

List of schools nearby:

- Dashmesh Model School, Kahma
- Govt High School, Jhander Kalan
- Sat Modern Public School, Mangat Dingrian
- Guru Teg Bahadur Model School, Behram
- Guru Ram Dass Public School, Cheta
- Lovely Public School, Pathlawa

== Transport ==
Banga railway station is the nearest train station however, Garhshankar Junction railway station is 18 kilometres (11 mi) away from the village. Sahnewal Airport is the nearest domestic airport which is located 62 kilometres (39 mi) away in Ludhiana and the nearest international airport is located in Chandigarh also Sri Guru Ram Dass Jee International Airport is the second nearest airport which is 142 kilometres (88 mi) away in Amritsar.

== See also ==
- List of villages in India
