= Ladian, SBS Nagar =

Ladian Ladian
- Village
- Location in Punjab, India Ladian (India)
- Coordinates: 31.2410128°N 75.9535182°E
- Country: India
- State: Punjab
- District: Shaheed Bhagat Singh Nagar

Government
  - Type: Panchayat raj
  - Body: Gram panchayat
- Elevation: 251 m (823 ft)

Population (2011)
  - Total: 793
- Sex ratio 398/395 ♂/♀

Languages
  - Official: Punjabi
- Time zone: UTC+5:30 (IST)
- PIN: 144505
- Telephone code: 01823
- ISO 3166 code: IN-PB
- Post office: Banga
- Website: nawanshahr.nic.in

Ladian is a village in Shaheed Bhagat Singh Nagar district of Punjab State, India. It is located 8.2 kilometres (5.1 mi) away from postal head office Banga, 37 kilometres (23 mi) from Nawanshahr, 19.8 kilometres (12.3 mi) from district headquarter Shaheed Bhagat Singh Nagar and 112 kilometres (70 mi) from state capital Chandigarh. The village is administrated by Sarpanch an elected representative of the village.

== Demography ==
As of 2011, Ladian has a total number of 153 houses and population of 793 of which 398 include are males while 395 are females according to the report published by Census India in 2011. The literacy rate of Ladian is 80.77%, higher than the state average of 75.84%. The population of children under the age of 6 years is 96 which is 12.11% of total population of Ladian, and child sex ratio is approximately 1182 as compared to Punjab state average of 846.

Most of the people are from Schedule Caste which constitutes 53.09% of total population in Ladian. The town does not have any Schedule Tribe population so far.

As per the report published by Census India in 2011, 227 people were engaged in work activities out of the total population of Ladian which includes 215 males and 12 females. According to census survey report 2011, 96.92% workers describe their work as main work and 3.08% workers are involved in Marginal activity providing livelihood for less than 6 months.

== Education ==
Amardeep Singh Shergill Memorial college Mukandpur and Sikh National College Banga are the nearest colleges. Industrial Training Institute for women (ITI Nawanshahr) is 23 kilometres (14 mi) The village is 69 kilometres (43 mi) from Indian Institute of Technology and 32 kilometres (20 mi) away from Lovely Professional University.

List of schools nearby:

- Govt Senior Secondary School, Ladhana Jhikka
- Dashmesh Model School, Kahma
- Govt High School, Jhander Kalan
- Govt Gigh School, Khan Khana
- Guru Ram Dass Public School, Cheta

== Transport ==
Banga railway station is the nearest train station, However, Garhshankar Junction train station is 24 kilometres (15 mi) away from the village. Sahnewal Airport is the nearest domestic airport located 74 kilometres (46 mi) away in Ludhiana and the nearest international airport is located in Chandigarh also Sri Guru Ram Dass Jee International Airport is the second nearest airport which is 141 kilometres (88 mi) away in Amritsar.

== See also ==
- List of villages in India
