= Khatkar Khurd =

- Village
- Location in Punjab, India Khatkar Khurd (India)
- Coordinates: 31.1949586°N 75.9875046°E
- Country: India
- State: Punjab
- District: Shaheed Bhagat Singh Nagar

Government
  - Type: Panchayat raj
  - Body: Gram panchayat
- Elevation: 251 m (823 ft)

Population (2011)
  - Total: 1,310
- Sex ratio 640/670 ♂/♀

Languages
  - Official: Punjabi
- Time zone: UTC+5:30 (IST)
- PIN: 144512
- Telephone code: 01884
- ISO 3166 code: IN-PB
- Post office: Kahma
- Website: nawanshahr.nic.in

Khatkar Khurd is a village in Shaheed Bhagat Singh Nagar district of Punjab State, India. It is located 7 kilometres (4.3 mi) away from postal head office Kahma, 16 kilometres (9.9 mi) from Nawanshahr, 13 kilometres (8.1 mi) from district headquarter Shaheed Bhagat Singh Nagar and 106 kilometres (66 mi) from state capital Chandigarh. The village is administrated by Sarpanch an elected representative of the village.

== Demography ==
As of 2011, Khatkar Khurd has a total number of 277 houses and population of 1310 of which 640 include are males while 670 are females according to the report published by Census India in 2011. The literacy rate of Khatkar Khurd is 78.41% higher than the state average of 75.84%. The population of children under the age of 6 years is 143 which is 10.92% of total population of Khatkar Khurd, and child sex ratio is approximately 959 as compared to Punjab state average of 846.

Most of the people are from Schedule Caste which constitutes 68.78% of total population in Khatkar Khurd. The town does not have any Schedule Tribe population so far.

As per the report published by Census India in 2011, 385 people were engaged in work activities out of the total population of Khatkar Khurd which includes 354 males and 31 females. According to census survey report 2011, 94.03% workers describe their work as main work and 5.97% workers are involved in Marginal activity providing livelihood for less than 6 months.

== Education ==
The village has a Punjabi medium, co-ed primary school established in 1955. The school provide mid-day meal as per Indian Midday Meal Scheme. As per Right of Children to Free and Compulsory Education Act the school provide free education to children between the ages of 6 and 14. The village also has an privet un-aided English medium, co-ed primary with upper primary and secondary school established in 2004.

Amardeep Singh Shergill Memorial college Mukandpur and Sikh National College Banga are the nearest colleges. Industrial Training Institute for women (ITI Nawanshahr) is 17 kilometres (11 mi) The village is 63 kilometres (39 mi) from Indian Institute of Technology and 32 kilometres (20 mi) away from Lovely Professional University.

== Transport ==
Banga railway station is the nearest train station however, Phagwara Junction railway station is 18 kilometres (11 mi) away from the village. Sahnewal Airport is the nearest domestic airport which located 60 kilometres (37 mi) away in Ludhiana and the nearest international airport is located in Chandigarh also Sri Guru Ram Dass Jee International Airport is the second nearest airport which is 140 kilometres (87 mi) away in Amritsar.

== See also ==
- List of villages in India
