= Soondh =

- Village
- Location in Punjab, India Soondh (India)
- Coordinates: 31.2299494°N 75.9098303°E
- Country: India
- State: Punjab
- District: Shaheed Bhagat Singh Nagar

Government
  - Type: Panchayat raj
  - Body: Gram panchayat
- Elevation: 251 m (823 ft)

Population (2011)
  - Total: 1,140
- Sex ratio 583/557 ♂/♀

Languages
  - Official: Punjabi
- Time zone: UTC+5:30 (IST)
- PIN: 144503
- Telephone code: 01823
- ISO 3166 code: IN-PB
- Post office: Maqsoodpur (B.O)
- Website: nawanshahr.nic.in

Soondh is a village in Shaheed Bhagat Singh Nagar district of Punjab State, India. It is located 3.6 kilometres (2.2 mi) away from branch post office Maqsoodpur, 29.7 kilometres (18.5 mi) from Nawanshahr, 27 kilometres (17 mi) from district headquarter Shaheed Bhagat Singh Nagar and 119 kilometres (74 mi) from state capital Chandigarh. The village is administrated by Sarpanch an elected representative of the village.

== Demography ==
As of 2011, Soondh has a total number of 245 houses and population of 1140 of which 583 include are males while 557 are females according to the report published by Census India in 2011. The literacy rate of Soondh is 77.33% higher than the state average of 75.84%. The population of children under the age of 6 years is 121 which is 10.61% of total population of Soondh, and child sex ratio is approximately 779 as compared to Punjab state average of 846.

Most of the people are from Schedule Caste which constitutes 61.40% of total population in Soondh. The town does not have any Schedule Tribe population so far.

As per the report published by Census India in 2011, 372 people were engaged in work activities out of the total population of Soondh which includes 325 males and 47 females. According to census survey report 2011, 73.92% workers describe their work as main work and 26.08% workers are involved in Marginal activity providing livelihood for less than 6 months.

== Education ==
The village has 3 school 2 govt and 1 private. Amardeep Singh Shergill Memorial college Mukandpur and Sikh National College Banga are the nearest colleges. Industrial Training Institute is 3 km away. The village is 100 kilometres (62 mi) away from Chandigarh University, 77 kilometres (48 mi) from Indian Institute of Technology and 26.7 kilometres (16.6 mi) away from Lovely Professional University.

List of schools nearby:

- Govt Senior Secondary School, Soondh
- S N Public school, Soondh
- Govt High School, Jhander Kalan
- Govt Gigh School, Khan Khana
- Guru Ram Dass Public School, Cheta

== Transport ==
Banga train station is the nearest train station however, Phagwara Junction railway station is 19 kilometres (12 mi) away from the village. Sahnewal Airport is the nearest domestic airport which located 69 kilometres (43 mi) away in Ludhiana and the nearest international airport is located in Chandigarh also Sri Guru Ram Dass Jee International Airport is the second nearest airport which is 136 kilometres (85 mi) away in Amritsar.

== See also ==
- List of villages in India
