= Gujjarpur Khurd =

- Village
- Location in Punjab, India Gujjarpur Khurd (India)
- Coordinates: 31.237887°N 76.0040422°E
- Country: India
- State: Punjab
- District: Shaheed Bhagat Singh Nagar

Government
  - Type: Panchayat raj
  - Body: Gram panchayat

Population (2011)
  - Total: 204
- Sex ratio 105/99 ♂/♀

Languages
  - Official: Punjabi
- Time zone: UTC+5:30 (IST)
- PIN: 144510
- Telephone code: 01823
- ISO 3166 code: IN-PB
- Post office: Ladhana Jhikka
- Website: nawanshahr.nic.in

Gujjarpur Khurd is a village in Shaheed Bhagat Singh Nagar district of Punjab State, India. It is located 7.5 kilometres (4.7 mi) away from Banga, 22 kilometres (14 mi) from Nawanshahr, 19 kilometres (12 mi) from district headquarter Shaheed Bhagat Singh Nagar and 112 kilometres (70 mi) from state capital Chandigarh. The village is administrated by Sarpanch an elected representative of the village.

== Demography ==
As of 2011, Gujjarpur Khurd has a total number of 40 houses and population of 204 of which 105 include are males while 99 are females according to the report published by Census India in 2011. The literacy rate of Gujjarpur Khurd is 84.27%, higher than the state average of 75.84%. The population of children under the age of 6 years is 26 which is 12.75 of total population of Gujjarpur Khurd, and child sex ratio is approximately 857 as compared to Punjab state average of 846.

Most of the people are from Schedule Caste which constitutes 45.59% of total population in Gujjarpur Khurd. The town does not have any Schedule Tribe population so far.

As per the report published by Census India in 2011, 68 people were engaged in work activities out of the total population of Gujjarpur Khurd which includes 58 males and 10 females. According to census survey report 2011, 97.06% workers describe their work as main work and 2.94% workers are involved in Marginal activity providing livelihood for less than 6 months.

== Education ==
The village has a Punjabi medium, co-ed primary school founded in 1961. The schools does not provide mid-day meal. The school provide free education to children between the ages of 6 and 14 as per Right of Children to Free and Compulsory Education Act. Amardeep Singh Shergill Memorial college Mukandpur and Sikh National College Banga are the nearest colleges. Lovely Professional University is 37 kilometres (23 mi) away from the village.

== Transport ==
Banga railway station is the nearest train station however, Garhshankar Junction railway station is 14 kilometres (8.7 mi) away from the village. Sahnewal Airport is the nearest domestic airport which located 66 kilometres (41 mi) away in Ludhiana and the nearest international airport is located in Chandigarh also Sri Guru Ram Dass Jee International Airport is the second nearest airport which is 147 kilometres (91 mi) away in Amritsar.

== See also ==
- List of villages in India
