= Jhander Khurd =

- Village
- Location in Punjab, India Jhander Khurd (India)
- Coordinates: 31.2183847°N 75.9055552°E
- Country: India
- State: Punjab
- District: Shaheed Bhagat Singh Nagar

Government
  - Type: Panchayat raj
  - Body: Gram panchayat
- Elevation: 251 m (823 ft)

Population (2011)
  - Total: 823
- Sex ratio 440/383 ♂/♀

Languages
  - Official: Punjabi
- Time zone: UTC+5:30 (IST)
- PIN: 144505
- Telephone code: 01884
- ISO 3166 code: IN-PB
- Post office: Banga
- Website: nawanshahr.nic.in

Jhander Khurd is a village in Shaheed Bhagat Singh Nagar district of Punjab State, India. Kalan is a Persian word for big and Khurd is a Persian word for small, when two villages have the same name they are distinguished by using Kalan or Khurd with the village name. It is located 10 kilometres (6.2 mi) away from Banga, 24 kilometres (15 mi) from Phagwara, 21 kilometres (13 mi) from district headquarter Shaheed Bhagat Singh Nagar and 114 kilometres (71 mi) from state capital Chandigarh. The village is administrated by Sarpanch an elected representative of the village.

== Demography ==
As of 2011, Jhander Khurd has a total number of 167 houses and population of 823 of which 440 include are males while 383 are females according to the report published by Census India in 2011. The literacy rate of Jhander Khurd is 80.50%, higher than the state average of 75.84%. The population of children under the age of 6 years is 69 which is 8.38% of total population of Jhander Khurd, and child sex ratio is approximately 1226 as compared to Punjab state average of 846.

Most of the people are from Schedule Caste which constitutes 64.28% of total population in Jhander Khurd. The town does not have any Schedule Tribe population so far.

As per the report published by Census India in 2011, 220 people were engaged in work activities out of the total population of Jhander Khurd which includes 205 males and 15 females. According to census survey report 2011, 100% workers describe their work as main work and 0% workers are involved in Marginal activity providing livelihood for less than 6 months.

== Education ==
Amardeep Singh Shergill Memorial college Mukandpur and Sikh National College Banga are the nearest colleges. Lovely Professional University is 28 kilometres (17 mi) away from the village.

List of schools nearby:

- Govt High School, Jhander Kalan
- Sat Modern Public School, Mangat Dingrian
- Guru Teg Bahadur Model School, Behram
- Guru Ram Dass Public School, Cheta
- Lovely Public School, Pathlawa

== Transport ==
Banga railway station is the nearest train station however, Phagwara Junction railway station is 20.5 kilometres (12.7 mi) away from the village. Sahnewal Airport is the nearest domestic airport which located 70 kilometres (43 mi) away in Ludhiana and the nearest international airport is located in Chandigarh also Sri Guru Ram Dass Jee International Airport is the second nearest airport which is 137 kilometres (85 mi) away in Amritsar.

== See also ==
- List of villages in India
