= Nurpur =

Nurpur may refer to:

- Nurpur, Fenchuganj, a village in Sylhet, Bangladesh
- Nurpur, Himachal Pradesh, a city and municipal council in the state of Himachal Pradesh, India
- Nurpur, Jalandhar, a village in Nakodar in Jalandhar district of Punjab State, India
- Nurpur, Murshidabad, a village in the state of West Bengal, India
- Nurpur, SBS Nagar, a village in Shaheed Bhagat Singh Nagar district of Punjab State, India
- Nurpur State, a princely state of India during the British Raj

== See also ==
- Noorpur (disambiguation)
