= Ambarish Rai =

Indian Right to Education activist (died 2021)

- Born: 1959 or 1960; Mau, Uttar Pradesh
- Died: April 23, 2021 (aged 61); Delhi
- Education: Lucknow University
- Known for: Education Activism

Ambarish Rai was an Indian Right to Education activist. He was the founder and national convener of the Right To Education (RTE) Forum, the largest civil society platform on education in India.

== Early life and education ==
Rai was a law graduate from University of Lucknow. During his university time, he was elected as general secretary of All India Students’ Federation, a student organization.

== Activism ==
As a student, Rai protested against the dual system of education in India. He was involved in activism with AISF and Communist Party of India (CPI) in UP and later worked as a member of CPI(ML)'s UP State Committee. He worked with the Indian People's Front and All India Central Council of Trade Unions in the 1990s. Rai mobilized Tribals in Gujarat and Maharashtra for a movement leading to the enactment of Forest Rights Act, 2006 and was the president of Lok Sangharsh Morcha.

He was appointed the national organizer for National Alliance for the Fundamental Right to Education (NAFRE) and later joined the People's Campaign for Common School System (PCCSS) in 2005. As part of the organizations, he played an instrumental role in increasing the demand for education to be made a fundamental right, leading to the 86th constitutional amendment aimed to "provide free and compulsory education of all children in the age group of six to fourteen years" as a Fundamental Right and the legislation of the Right of Children to Free and Compulsory Education Act, 2009.

In 2010, he formed the RTE Forum — a coalition of 10,000 educators, nonprofits, teachers’ unions, networks and community members — a platform aiming to achieve full realization of the Right to Education Act.

In 2018, he was chosen as a Malala Fund Education Champion and worked towards advancing girls' education in the country. Contrary to increasing privatization efforts, Rai advocated an increase in allocation for education in the budget. He was a supporter of the no detention policy and felt that students cannot be blamed for systemic failures.

== Death ==
Rai died on 23 April 2021 in Delhi with COVID-like symptoms and was a victim of Oxygen shortage at the height of the pandemic in the city.
