= Noorpur =

Noorpur may refer to one of the following places:

== India ==
- Noorpur, Himachal Pradesh, a town in Himachal Pradesh, India
- Noorpur, Uttar Pradesh, a city in Uttar Pradesh, India
  - Noorpur (Assembly constituency) in Uttar Pradesh, India
- Noorpur Muzbida Harsana, a village in Bagpat district, Uttar Pradesh

== Pakistan ==
- Noorpur Thal, a city in Khushab District of Punjab
  - Noorpur Thal Tehsil, a tehsil in Khushab District of Punjab
  - Jamali Noorpur, a union council of Khushab District
- Noor Pur 122 JB, a town in Faisalabad District of Punjab
- Noorpur, Chakwal, a town in Chakwal District of Punjab
- Noorpur Stupas, an archaeological site in Gilgit, Gilgit-Baltistan

== See also ==
- Nurpur (disambiguation)
