= Master Madan =

- Born: Madan; 28 December 1927; Khan Khana, Shaheed Bhagat Singh Nagar district
- Died: 5 June 1942 (aged 14)
- Other name: The Ghazal King
- Occupation: singer
- Musical career
- Genres: Ghazal and Geet
- Instrument: Vocals
- Years active: 1937–1941

Master Madan - Yun Na Reh Reh Kar Hamein Tarsaiye

Master Madan (Gurmukhi: ਮਾਸਟਰ ਮਦਨ; 28 December 1927 – 5 June 1942) was a talented Ghazal and geet singer of India of pre-independence era. During his life, he only recorded eight songs, and these are now commonly available. He was born on 28 December 1927, in Khan Khana, a village in District Jalandhar District (now Nawanshahar) of the Punjab. This village was founded by reputed courtier of Akbar, Abdul Rahim Khan-i-Khana, who was a prolific writer. He died on 5 June 1942, reportedly due to mercury poisoning of his milk while at Shimla.

His eight songs are:

- Bagaan wich peengan paiyaan (Punjabi)
- Raavi de parle kandey (Punjabi)
- Yun naa reh reh kar hamein tarsaaiye (Urdu Ghazal)
- Heyrat se tak rahaay hain jahane wafaa mujhe (Urdu Ghazal)
- Goree goree baiyaan (Thumri)
- Mori bintee mano kanha re (Thumri)
- Man ki man hi mahi rahi (Gurbani)
- Chetnaa hei to chet le (Gurbani)
