= Ladhana Jhikka =

- Village
- Location in Punjab, India Ladhana Jhikka (India)
- Coordinates: 31.2146026°N 76.0193252°E
- Country: India
- State: Punjab
- District: Shaheed Bhagat Singh Nagar

Government
  - Type: Panchayat raj
  - Body: Gram panchayat
- Elevation: 251 m (823 ft)

Population (2011)
  - Total: 2,664
- Sex ratio 1292/1372 ♂/♀

Languages
  - Official: Punjabi
- Time zone: UTC+5:30 (IST)
- PIN: 144510
- Telephone code: 01823
- ISO 3166 code: IN-PB
- Post office: Ladhana Jhikka
- Website: nawanshahr.nic.in

Ladhana Jhikka is a village in Shaheed Bhagat Singh Nagar district of Punjab State, India. It is located 4 kilometres (2.5 mi) away from Banga, 12 kilometres (7.5 mi) from Nawanshahr, 12 kilometres (7.5 mi) from district headquarter Shaheed Bhagat Singh Nagar and 108 kilometres (67 mi) from state capital Chandigarh. The village is administrated by Sarpanch an elected representative of the village.

== Demography ==
As of 2011, Ladhana Jhikka has a total number of 584 houses and population of 2664 of which 1292 include are males while 1372 are females according to the report published by Census India in 2011. The literacy rate of Ladhana Jhikka is 79.84%, higher than the state average of 75.84%. The population of children under the age of 6 years is 283 which is 10.62% of total population of Ladhana Jhikka, and child sex ratio is approximately 1081 as compared to Punjab state average of 846.

Most of the people are from Saini or Shoorsaini Rajput caste which is 80% of population. Schedule Caste which constitutes 17.19% of total population in Ladhana Jhikka. The town does not have any Schedule Tribe population so far.[1]

As per the report published by Census India in 2011, 721 people were engaged in work activities out of the total population of Ladhana Jhikka which includes 663 males and 58 females. According to census survey report 2011, 82.11% workers describe their work as main work and 17.89% workers are involved in marginal activity providing livelihood for less than 6 months.

== Education ==
The village has a Punjabi medium, co-ed upper primary with secondary/higher secondary school established in 1953. The schools provide mid-day meal as per Indian Midday Meal Scheme. The school provide free education to children between the ages of 6 and 14 as per Right of Children to Free and Compulsory Education Act.

Amardeep Singh Shergill Memorial college Mukandpur and Sikh National College Banga are the nearest colleges. Industrial Training Institute for women (ITI Nawanshahr) is 19 kilometres (12 mi) The village is 65 kilometres (40 mi) from Indian Institute of Technology and 35 kilometres (22 mi) away from Lovely Professional University.

== Transport ==
Banga railway station is the nearest train station, However, Garhshankar Junction train station is 15 kilometres (9.3 mi) away from the village. Sahnewal Airport is the nearest domestic airport located 64 kilometres (40 mi) away in Ludhiana and the nearest international airport is located in Chandigarh also Sri Guru Ram Dass Jee International Airport is the second nearest airport which is 144 kilometres (89 mi) away in Amritsar.

== See also ==
- List of villages in India
