= Kahma =

- Village
- Location in Punjab, India Kahma (India)
- Coordinates: 31.1657092°N 76.0372372°E
- Country: India
- State: Punjab
- District: Shaheed Bhagat Singh Nagar

Government
  - Type: Panchayat raj
  - Body: Gram panchayat
- Elevation: 251 m (823 ft)

Population (2011)
  - Total: 3,320
- Sex ratio 1690/1630 ♂/♀

Languages
  - Official: Punjabi
- Time zone: UTC+5:30 (IST)
- PIN: 144512
- Telephone code: 01823
- ISO 3166 code: IN-PB
- Post office: Kahma
- Website: nawanshahr.nic.in

Kahma is a village in Shaheed Bhagat Singh Nagar district of Punjab State, India. It is situated on Phagwara-Mohali expressway located 5.4 kilometres (3.4 mi) away from Banga, 9 kilometres (5.6 mi) from Nawanshahr, 10.4 kilometres (6.5 mi) from district headquarter Shaheed Bhagat Singh Nagar and 96 kilometres (60 mi) from state capital Chandigarh. The village is administrated by Sarpanch an elected representative of the village, Husnlal Bhagatram born in the village they're the first legendary music directors duo in Bollywood. They are two brothers, Husn Lal and Bhagat Ram. Husn Lal was also a renowned violinist, vocalist and music composer, but his prowess as singer is not commonly known. Bhagat Ram was considered an expert harmonium player .

== Demography ==
As of 2011, Kahma has a total number of 700 houses and population of 3320 of which 1690 include are males while 1630 are females according to the report published by Census India in 2011. The literacy rate of Kahma is 80.83%, higher than the state average of 75.84%. The population of children under the age of 6 years is 321 which is 9.67% of total population of Kahma, and child sex ratio is approximately 845 as compared to Punjab state average of 846.

Most of the people are from Schedule Caste which constitutes 45.57% of total population in Kahma. The town does not have any Schedule Tribe population so far.

As per the report published by Census India in 2011, 1009 people were engaged in work activities out of the total population of Kahma which includes 887 males and 122 females. According to census survey report 2011, 94.35% workers describe their work as main work and 5.65% workers are involved in marginal activity providing livelihood for less than 6 months. (Vallage has one mahahasti ram kutyia) its located just outside of Valley on Musapur road.

== Education ==
The village has a Punjabi medium, co-ed upper primary with secondary/higher secondary school founded in 1940. The school provide mid-day meal as per Indian Midday Meal Scheme. As per Right of Children to Free and Compulsory Education Act the school provide free education to children between the ages of 6 and 14.

Amardeep Singh Shergill Memorial college Mukandpur and Sikh National College Banga are the nearest colleges. Lovely Professional University is 36 kilometres (22 mi) away from the village.

List of schools nearby:

- Dashmesh Model School, Kahma
- Govt High School, Jhander Kalan
- Sat Modern Public School, Mangat Dingrian
- Guru Teg Bahadur Model School, Behram
- Guru Ram Dass Public School, Cheta
- Lovely Public School, Pathlawa

== Transport ==
Khatkar Kalan Jhandaji railway station is the nearest train station however, Garhshankar Junction railway station is 17 kilometres (11 mi) away from the village. Sahnewal Airport is the nearest domestic airport which located 64 kilometres (40 mi) away in Ludhiana and the nearest international airport is located in Chandigarh also Sri Guru Ram Dass Jee International Airport is the second nearest airport which is 145 kilometres (90 mi) away in Amritsar.

== See also ==
- List of villages in India
