= Khan Khana =

- Village
- Khankhana
- Location in Punjab, India Khan Khana (India)
- Coordinates: 31.1537869°N 75.9582734°E
- Country: India
- State: Punjab
- District: Shaheed Bhagat Singh Nagar

Government
  - Type: Panchayat raj
  - Body: Gram panchayat
- Elevation: 254 m (833 ft)

Population (2011)
  - Total: 2,469
- Sex ratio 1270/1199 ♂/♀

Languages
  - Official: Punjabi
- Time zone: UTC+5:30 (IST)
- PIN: 144509
- Telephone code: 01823
- ISO 3166 code: IN-PB 78
- Vehicle registration: PB32
- Post office: Khan Khana
- Website: nawanshahr.nic.in

Khan Khana or Khankhana (Urdu: خان خاناں) is a village in Shaheed Bhagat Singh Nagar district of Punjab State, India. It is located 4 kilometres (2.5 mi) away Mukandpur, 7 kilometres (4.3 mi) from Banga, 13.5 kilometres (8.4 mi) from district headquarter Shaheed Bhagat Singh Nagar and 111 kilometres (69 mi) from state capital Chandigarh. The village is administrated by Sarpanch an elected representative of the village.

== History ==
The village was named after Abdul Rahim Khan-i-Khanan, a poet who lived during the rule of Mughal emperor Akbar. He was one of the nine important ministers (dewan) in his court, also known as the Navaratnas.

== Demography ==
As of 2011, Khan Khana has 539 houses and a population of 2469 of which 1270 include are males while 1199 are females according to the report published by Census India in 2011. The literacy rate of Khan Khana is 80.47%, higher than the state average of 75.84%. The population of children under the age of 6 years is 236 which is 9.56% of total population of Khan Khana, and child sex ratio is approximately 944 as compared to Punjab state average of 846.

Most of the people are from Schedule Caste which constitutes 60.43% of total population in Khan Khana. The town does not have any Schedule Tribe population so far.

As per the report published by Census India in 2011, 767 people were engaged in work activities out of the total population of Khan Khana which includes 686 males and 81 females. According to census survey report 2011, 52.28% workers describe their work as main work and 47.72% workers are involved in Marginal activity providing livelihood for less than 6 months.

== Education ==
The village has a Punjabi medium, girls only upper primary with secondary school and a boys-only primary school. The schools provide mid-day meal as per Indian Midday Meal Scheme and the meal prepared in school premises. As per Right of Children to Free and Compulsory Education Act the school provide free education to children between the ages of 6 and 14.

Khalsa Middle School is one of the oldest school in the village which was founded in 1923, by overseas Punjabis in Stockton the school was intended to provide Punjabi-language education. Amardeep Singh Shergill Memorial college Mukandpur and Sikh National College Banga are the nearest colleges.

== Transport ==
Banga train station is the nearest train station however, Phagwara Junction railway station is 24 kilometres (15 mi) away from the village. Sahnewal Airport is the nearest domestic airport which located 57 kilometres (35 mi) away in Ludhiana and the nearest international airport is located in Chandigarh also Sri Guru Ram Dass Jee International Airport is the second nearest airport which is 140 kilometres (87 mi) away in Amritsar.

== Notable people ==
- Ghazal and geet singer of India of pre-independence era Master Madan was born in Khan Khana (Khankhana).

== See also ==
- List of villages in India
