= Lunch =

Midday meal

Lunch is a meal typically consumed around the middle of the day, following breakfast and preceding dinner. It varies in form, size, and significance across cultures and historical periods. In some societies, lunch constitutes the main meal of the day and may consist of multiple courses, while in others it is lighter and more utilitarian in nature.

The foods consumed at lunch follow local dietary customs, and may range from simple items such as sandwiches or salads to more elaborate meals that include rice, noodles, or soups. Regional and cultural practices are further influenced by factors such as religion, geography, and economic context.

Lunch served on a tray in a Russian canteen. The main dish is a tomato-based fish soup. Accompanying the soup are a plate of mashed potatoes and a salad with a slice of bread

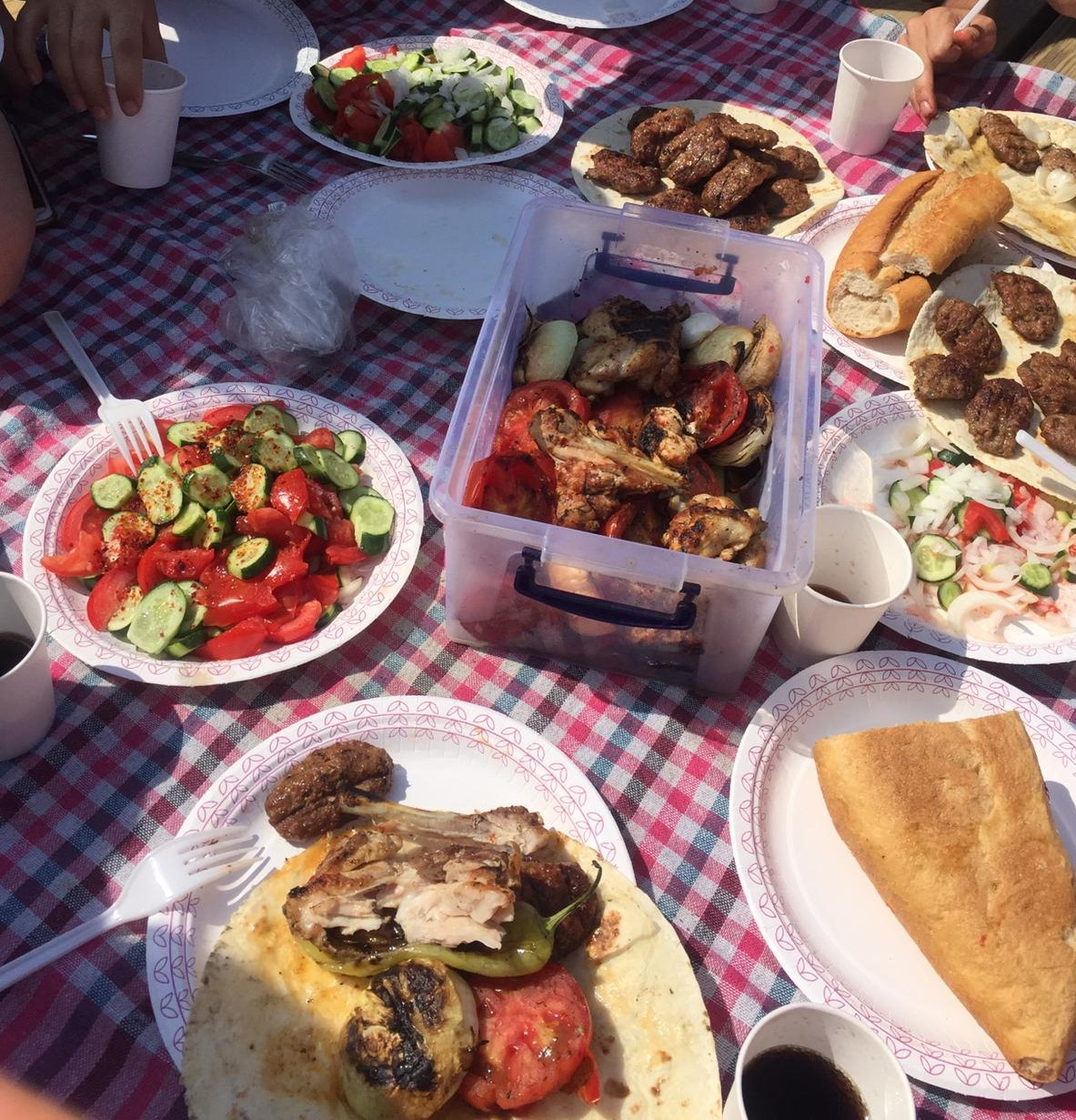
A traditional Turkish picnic party

== Etymology ==
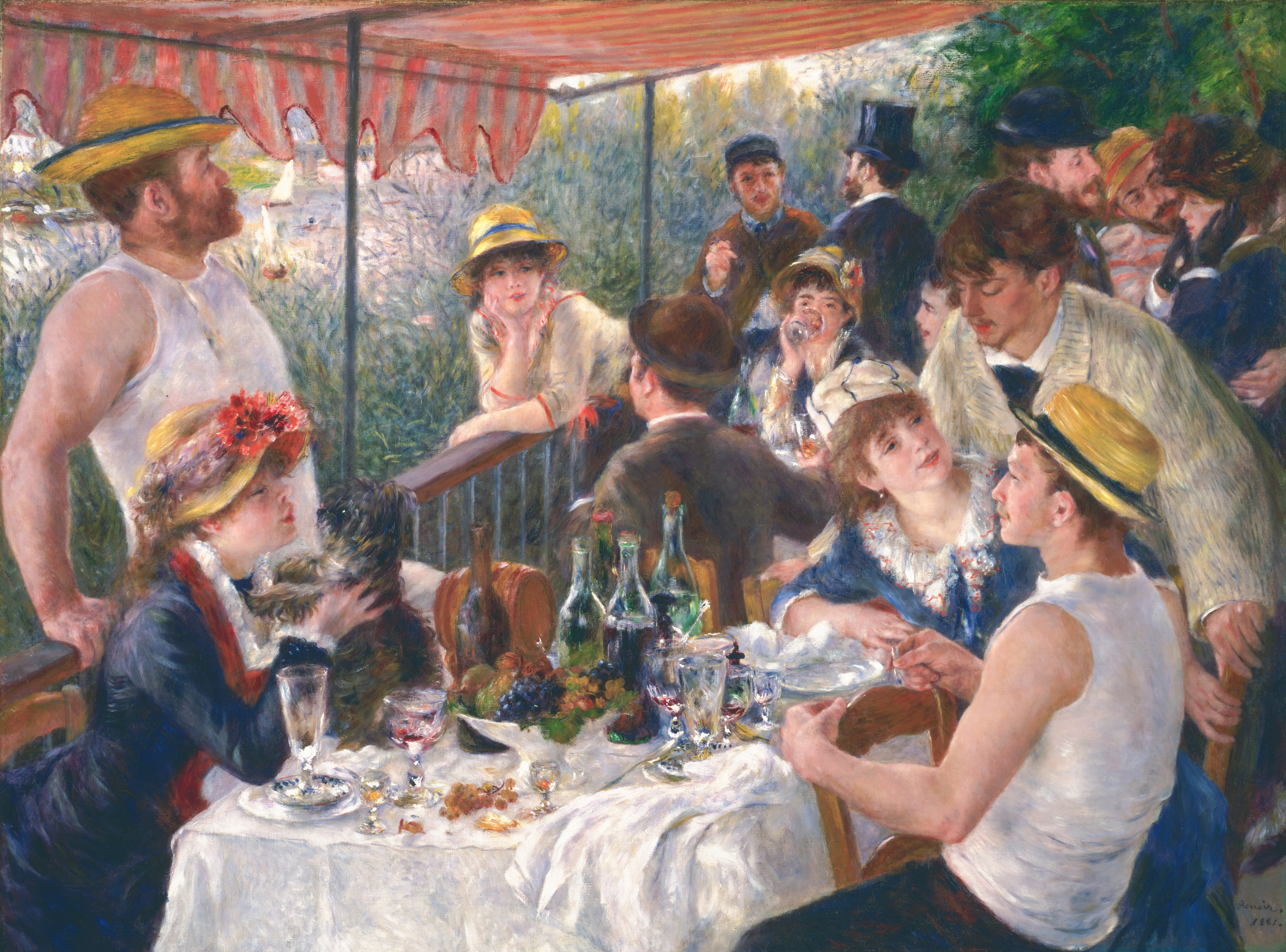
Luncheon of the Boating Party by French impressionist Pierre-Auguste Renoir, 1881.

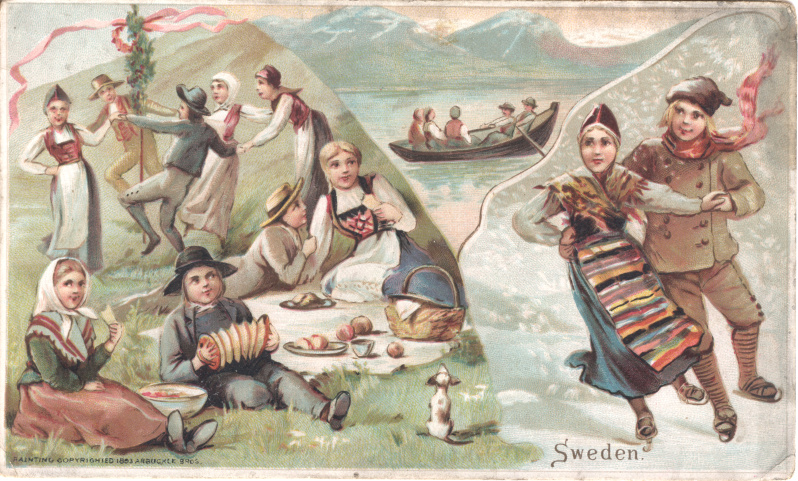
A Swedish outdoor picnic

According to the Oxford English Dictionary (OED), the etymology of lunch is uncertain. It may have evolved from lump in a similar way to bunch, a derivative of bump, and hunch, a derivative of hump. Alternatively, it may have evolved from the Spanish lonja, meaning 'slice of ham'. It was first recorded in 1591 with the meaning 'thick piece, hunk' as in "lunch of bacon". The modern definition was in usage from before 21 March 1776.

The word luncheon (/ˈlʌntʃən/) has a similarly uncertain origin according to the OED, being "related in some way" to lunch. It is possible luncheon is an extension of lunch, as with punch to puncheon and trunch to truncheon. Originally interchangeable with lunch, it is now used in especially formal circumstances. The Oxford Companion to Food claims that luncheon is a Northern England English word which is derived from the Old English word nuncheon or nunchin meaning 'noon drink'. The OED records the words "nuncheon" and "nunchion" with the meaning "drink" or "snack" in various forms since the Middle English period.

== History ==
Tastes in food, menu items, and meal periods have changed dramatically over time. During the Middle Ages, the main meal of the day, then called dinner, for almost everyone, took place late in the morning after several hours of work, when there was no need for artificial lighting. In the early to mid-17th century, the meal could be any time between late morning and mid-afternoon.

In England, during the late 17th and 18th centuries, this meal was gradually pushed back into the evening, creating a greater time gap between breakfast and dinner. A meal called lunch came to fill this gap. The late evening meal, called supper, became squeezed out as dinner advanced into the evening, and often turned into a snack. Formal "supper parties", artificially lit by candles, sometimes with entertainment, persisted as late as the Regency era, and a ball normally included supper, often served very late.

Until the early 19th century, luncheon was generally reserved for the ladies, who would often have lunch with one another when their husbands were out. The meal was relatively light, and typically included left-overs from the previous night's dinner, which were often plentiful. As late as 1945, Emily Post wrote in the magazine Etiquette that luncheon is "generally given by and for women, but it is not unusual, especially in summer places or in town on Saturday or Sunday, to include an equal number of men" – hence the mildly disparaging phrase, "the ladies who lunch". Lunch was a ladies' light meal; when the Prince of Wales stopped to eat a dainty luncheon with lady friends, he was laughed at for this effeminacy.

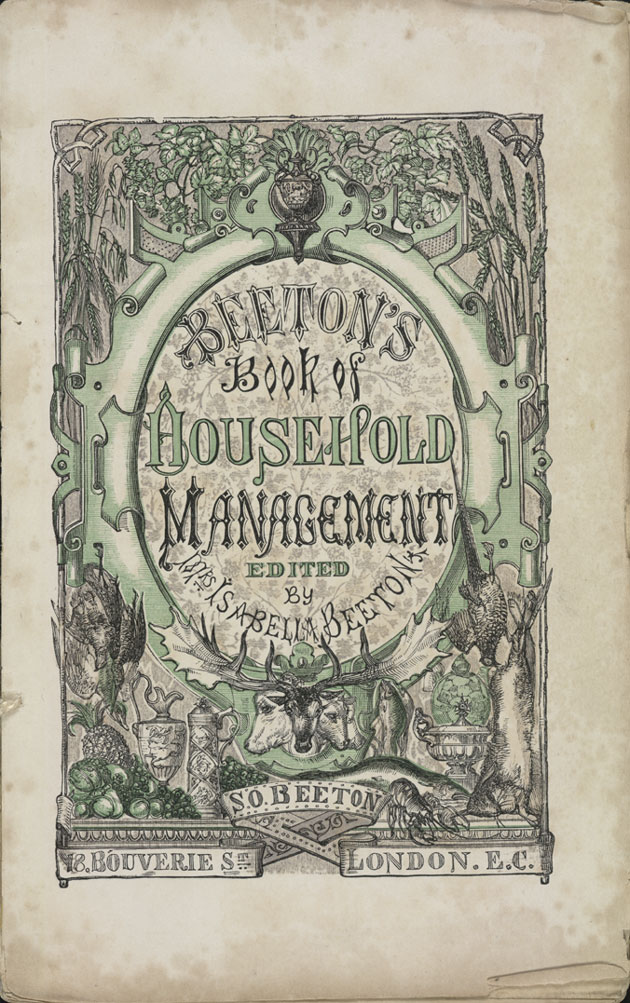
Mrs Beeton's Book of Household Management, a guide to all aspects of running a household in Victorian Britain

Beginning in the 1840s, afternoon tea supplemented this luncheon at four o'clock. Mrs Beeton's Book of Household Management (1861) – a guide to all aspects of running a household in Victorian Britain, edited by Isabella Beeton – had much less to explain about luncheon than about dinners or ball suppers:

The remains of cold joints, nicely garnished, a few sweets, or a little hashed meat, poultry, or game, are the usual articles placed on the table for luncheon, with bread and cheese, biscuits, butter, etc. If a substantial meal is desired, rump-steaks or mutton chops may be served, as also veal cutlets, kidneys... In families where there is a nursery, the mistress of the house often partakes of the meal with the children and makes it her luncheon. In the summer, a few dishes of fresh fruit should be added to the luncheon, or, instead of this, a compote of fruit or fruit tart or pudding.

=== Modern ===
With the growth of industrialisation in the 19th century, male workers began to work long shifts at the factory, severely disrupting the age-old eating habits of rural life. Initially, workers were sent home for a quick dinner provided by their wives, but as the workplace was moved further from home, working men took to giving themselves something portable to eat during a break in the middle of the day.

The lunch meal slowly became institutionalized in England when workers with long and fixed-hour jobs at the factory were eventually given an hour off work to eat lunch and thus gain strength for the afternoon shift. Stalls and later chop houses near the factories began to provide mass-produced food for the working class, and the meal soon became an established part of the daily routine, remaining so to this day.

In many countries and regions, lunch is the dinner or main meal. Prescribed lunchtimes allow workers to return to their homes to eat with their families. Consequently, businesses close during lunchtime when lunch is the customary main meal of the day. Lunch also becomes dinner on special days, such as holidays or events, including, for example, Christmas dinner and harvest dinners like Thanksgiving; on these special days, dinner is usually served in the early afternoon. The main meal on Sunday, whether at a restaurant or home, is called "Sunday dinner", and for Christians is served after morning church services.

== Asia ==
A traditional Bengali lunch is a seven-course meal. Bengali cuisine is a culinary style originating in Bengal, a region in the eastern part of the Indian subcontinent, which is now divided between Bangladesh and Indian states of West Bengal, Tripura, Assam's Barak Valley. The first course is shukto, which is a mix of vegetables cooked with few spices and topped with a coconut sauce. The second course consists of rice, dal, and a vegetable curry. The third course consists of rice and fish curry. The fourth course is that of rice and meat curry (generally chevon, mutton, chicken or lamb). The fifth course contains sweet preparations like rasgulla, pantua, rajbhog, sandesh, etc. The sixth course consists of payesh or mishti doi (sweet yogurt). The seventh course is that of paan, which acts as a mouth freshener.

In Japan, lunch (昼食, chūshoku) often consists of rice or noodle dishes such as ramen, soba and udon bowls. Many Japanese people will also take a boxed lunch, known as a bentō, to class or to work with them. Sushi, donburi and teishoku are also common. Additionally, other Japanese lunch options include quick and convenient foods like onigiri (rice balls), sandwiches, and instant noodles, catering to busy individuals.

In China today, lunch is not nearly as complicated as it was before industrialisation. Rice, noodles and other mixed hot foods are often eaten, either at a restaurant or brought in a container. Western cuisine is not uncommon. It is called 午餐 or 午饭 in most areas.

== Australia ==
In Australia, a light meal eaten in the period between 10:30 am and noon is considered morning tea. An actual lunch will be eaten between noon and 2:00 pm. While usually consisting of fruit or a cereal product, a typical Australian brunch may include other foods as well such as burgers, sandwiches, other light food items, and hot dishes. Sometimes, a meal during the late afternoon is referred to as "afternoon tea", a meal in which food portions are usually significantly smaller than at lunch, sometimes consisting of nothing more than coffee or other beverages.

== Europe ==
=== Western ===
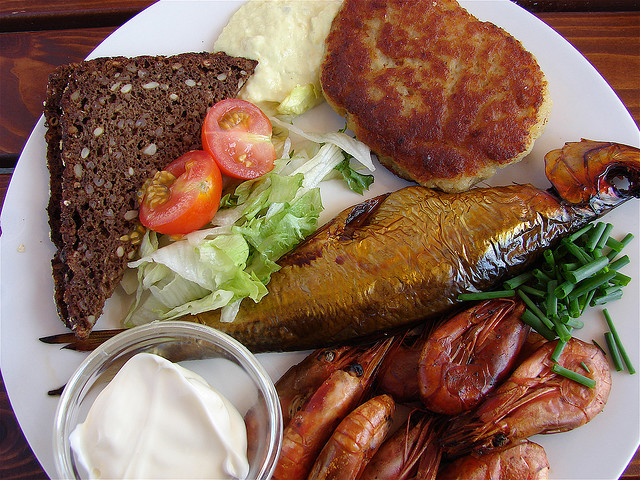
A lunch on the Danish island of Bornholm

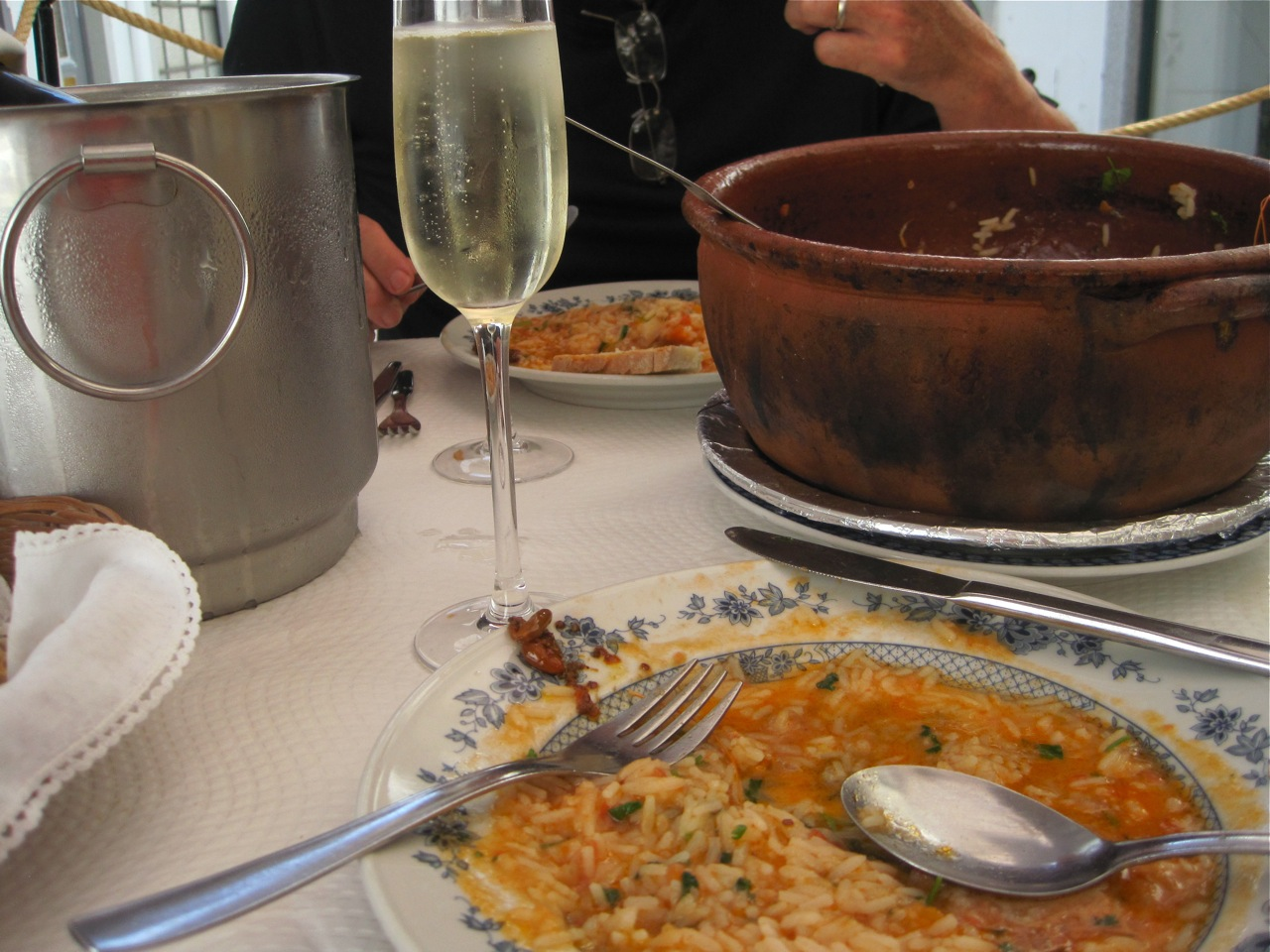
An arroz de marisco (shellfish-rice) lunch dish in Portugal

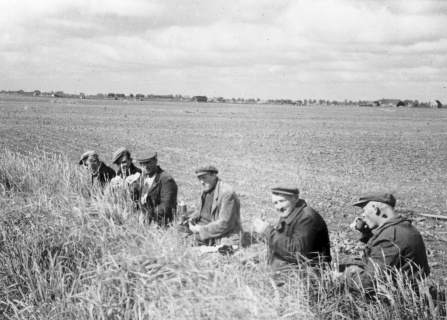
Farmworkers taking a lunch break at Nieuw-Scheemda, Oldambt, Groningen, Netherlands, c. 1955

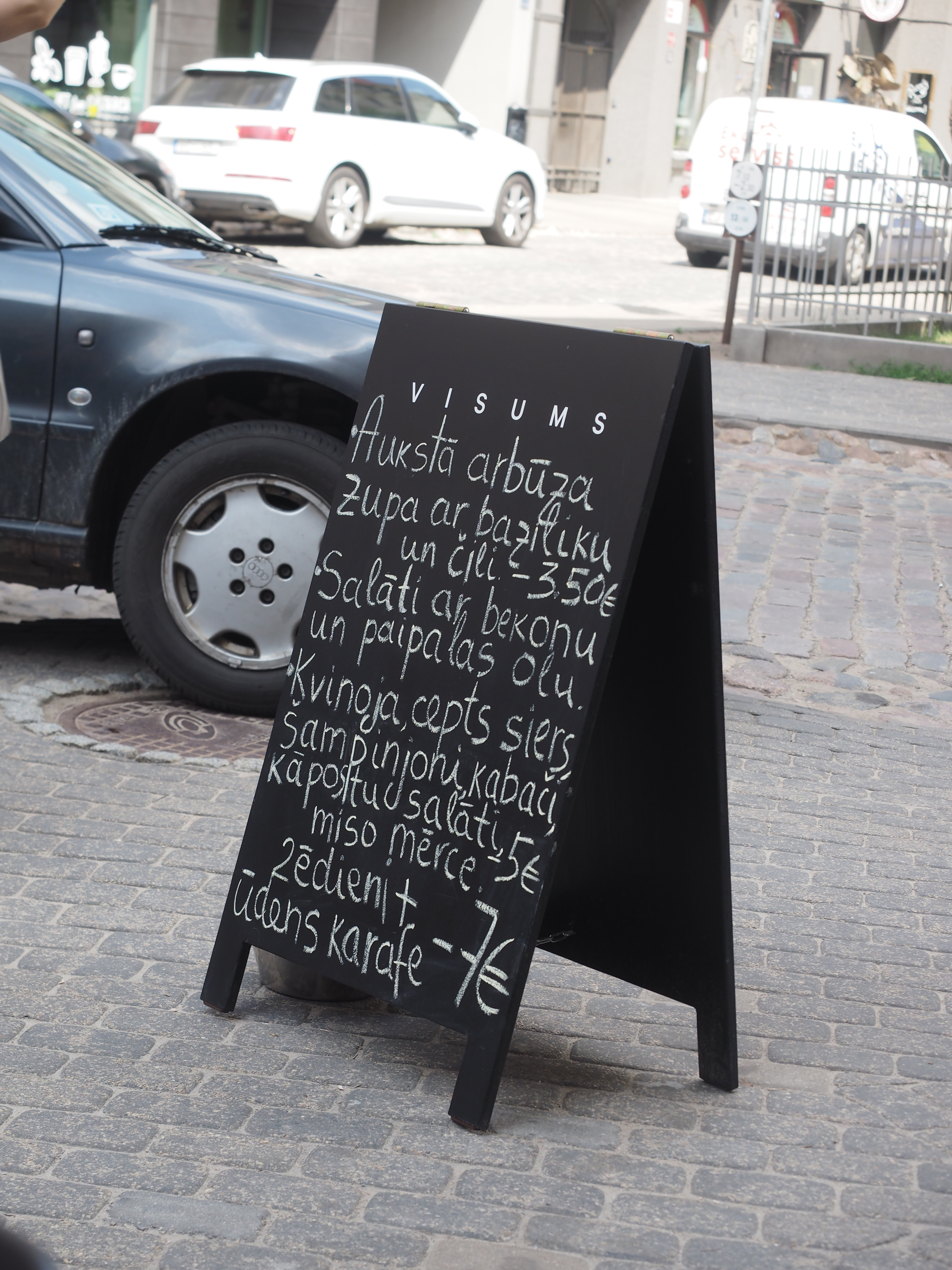
A lunch menu at a restaurant in Riga, Latvia.

Lunch in Denmark, referred to as frokost, is a light meal. It often includes rye bread with different toppings such as liver pâté, herring, and cheese. Smørrebrød is a Danish lunch delicacy that is typically used for business meetings or special events.

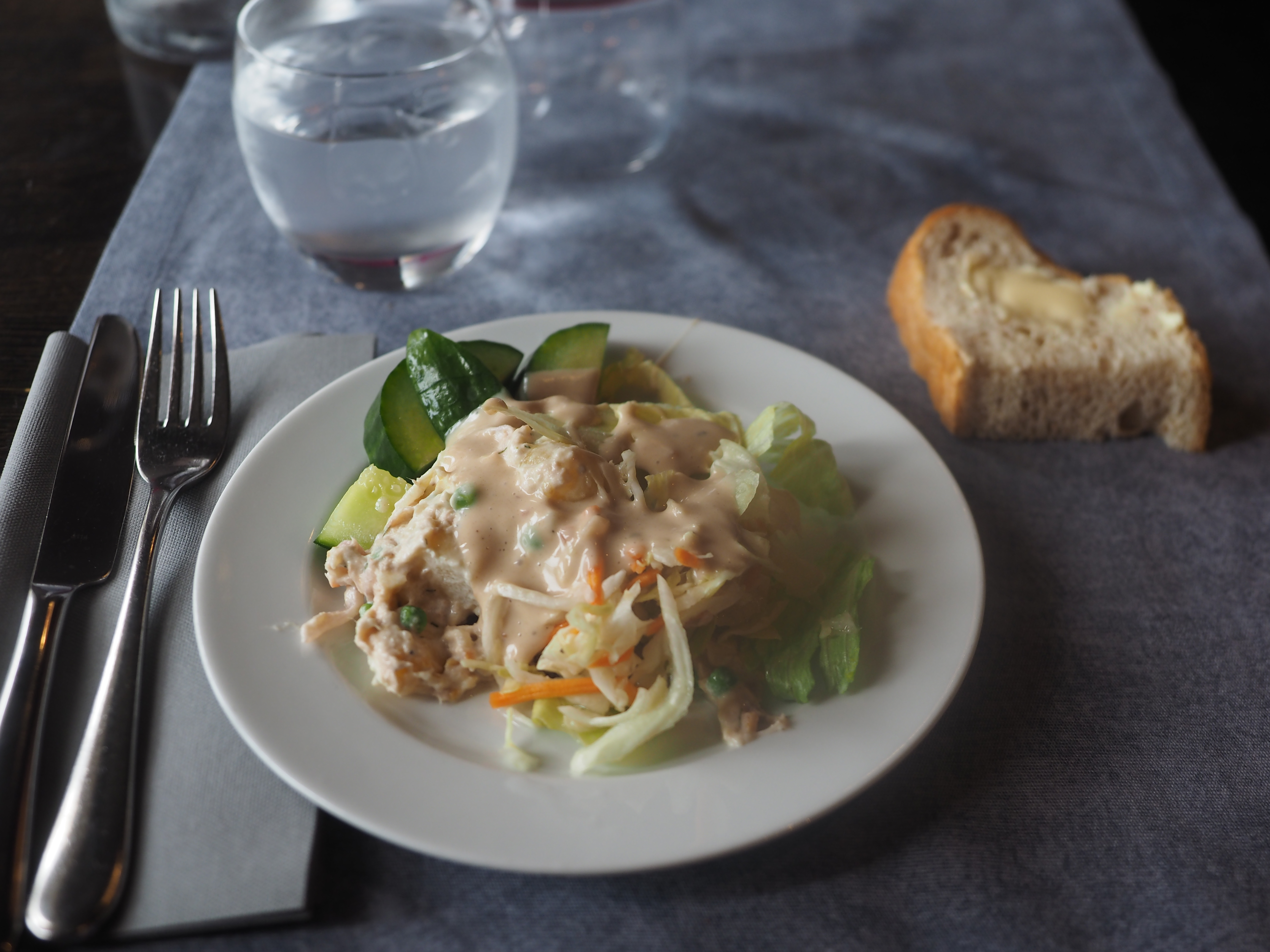
Lunch in Finland usually includes a small salad as a starter.

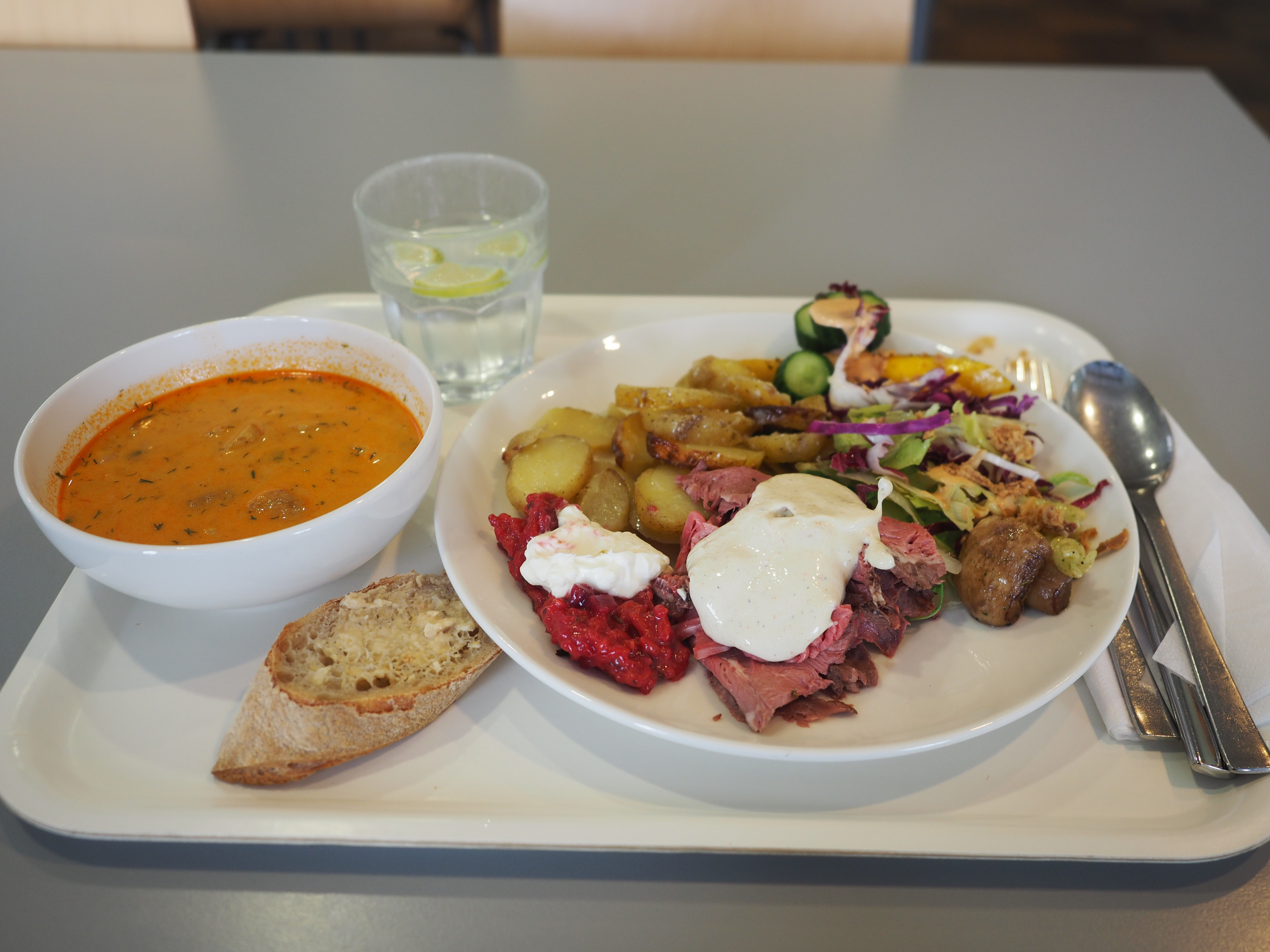
Many restaurants serve lunch from a buffet rather than fixed portions.

In Finland, lunch is a full hot meal, (Note: "In Norway and Denmark the common lunch is based on sandwiches, whereas in Finland and Sweden the hot lunch is the norm.") served as one course, sometimes with small salads and desserts. Dishes are diverse, ranging from meat or fish courses to soups that are heavy enough to constitute a meal.

In France, the midday meal is taken between noon and 2:00 p.m.

In Italy, lunch is taken around 30 minutes past noon in the north and at 2:00 p.m. in the center south; it is a full meal, but is lighter than supper.

In Germany, lunch was traditionally the main meal of the day. (Note: "Traditionally, lunch would be the main meal of the day. In the domestic arena, modern working practices have changed this considerably, although many restaurants still tout lunchtime dishes or a fixed lunch menu Gedeck or Tagesmenü.") It is traditionally a substantial hot meal, sometimes with additional courses like soup and dessert. It is usually a savoury dish consisting of protein (e.g., meat), starchy foods (e.g., potatoes), and vegetables or salad. Casseroles and stews are popular as well. There are a few sweet dishes like Germknödel or rice pudding that can also serve as a main course. Lunch is called Mittagessen – literally, "midday's food".

In the Netherlands, Belgium, and Norway, it is common to eat sandwiches for lunch: slices of bread that people usually carry to work or school and eat in the canteen. The slices of bread are normally filled with sweet or savoury foodstuffs such as chocolate sprinkles (hagelslag), apple syrup, peanut butter, slices of meat, cheese or kroket. The meal typically includes coffee, milk or juice, and sometimes yogurt, fruit or soup. It is eaten around noon, during a lunch break.

In Portugal, lunch (almoço in Portuguese) consists of a full hot meal, similar to dinner, usually with soup, meat or fish course, and dessert. It is served between noon and 2:00 pm It is the main meal of the day throughout the country. The Portuguese word lanche derives from the English word "lunch", but it refers to a lighter meal or snack taken during the afternoon (around 5 pm) due to the fact that, traditionally, Portuguese dinner is served at a later hour than in English-speaking countries.

In Spain, the midday meal, "lunch" (Spanish: almuerzo (Note: In most of Spain, the word "almuerzo" means lunch. However, in Eastern Spain, "almuerzo" refers to the brunch, a light meal taken at around 11:00 pm; this region uses "comida" (literally "food") to refer to lunch.)) takes place between 1:00 pm and 3:00 pm and is effectively dinner, (the main meal of the day); in contrast, supper normally begins between 8:30 pm and 10:00 pm. Being the main meal of the day everywhere, it usually consists of a three-course meal: the first course typically consists of an appetizer; the main course of a more elaborate dish, usually meat- or fish-based; the dessert of something sweet, often accompanied by a coffee or small amounts of spirits. Most places of work have a complete restaurant with a lunch break of at least an hour. Spanish schools also have a full restaurant, and students have a one-hour break. Three courses are standard practice at home, workplace, and schools. Most small shops close for between two and four hours – usually between 1:30 pm to 4:30 pm – to allow to go home for a full lunch.

In Sweden, lunch is usually a full hot meal, much like in Finland.

In the United Kingdom, lunch is usually eaten early in the afternoon. Lunch is often purveyed and consumed in pubs. Pub lunch dishes include fish and chips, ploughman's lunch and others. On Sundays, it is usually the main meal, and typically the largest and most formal meal of the week, to which family or other guests may be invited. It traditionally centres on a Sunday roast joint of meat. It may be served rather later than a weekday lunch.

=== Central ===
In Hungary, lunch is traditionally the main meal of the day, following a leves (soup).

In Poland, the main meal of the day (called obiad) is traditionally eaten between 1:00 pm and 5:00 pm, (Note: "Obiad is closer to a Western dinner, but the timing is more like lunch. You could say it's a dinner at lunchtime.") and consists of a soup and a main dish. Most Poles equate the English word "lunch" with "obiad" because it is the second of the three main meals of the day; śniadanie (breakfast), obiad (lunch/dinner) and kolacja (dinner/supper). There is another meal eaten by some called drugie śniadanie, which means "second breakfast". Drugie śniadanie is eaten around 10:00 am and is a light snack, usually consisting of sandwiches, salad, or a thin soup.

In Romania, lunch (prânz in Romanian) is the main hot meal of the day. Lunch normally consists of two dishes: usually, the first course is a soup and the second course, the main course, often consists of meat accompanied by potato, rice or pasta (garnitură). Traditionally, people used to bake and eat desserts, but nowadays it is less common. On Sundays, the lunch is more consistent and is usually accompanied by an appetiser or salad.

=== Eastern ===
In Russia, the midday meal is taken in the afternoon. lunch is typically the biggest meal (Note: "Lunch, according to an earlier Russian tradition, was the main meal of the day. A light lunch is usually taken at work.") and consists of a first course, usually a soup, and a second course that would be meat and a garnish. Tea is the standard beverage.

In Bosnia and Herzegovina, lunch is the day's main meal. It is traditionally a substantial hot meal, sometimes with additional courses like soup and dessert. It is usually a savoury dish, consisting of protein (such as meat), starchy foods (such as potatoes), and a vegetable or salad. It is normally eaten around 2:00 pm.

In Bulgaria, lunch is normally eaten between noon and 2:00 pm. In the capital of Sofia, people usually order takeaway because lunch breaks are too short to go in place. In other areas, Bulgarians often have salad as the first meal and a dish from the national cuisine as the second one.

== Middle East ==
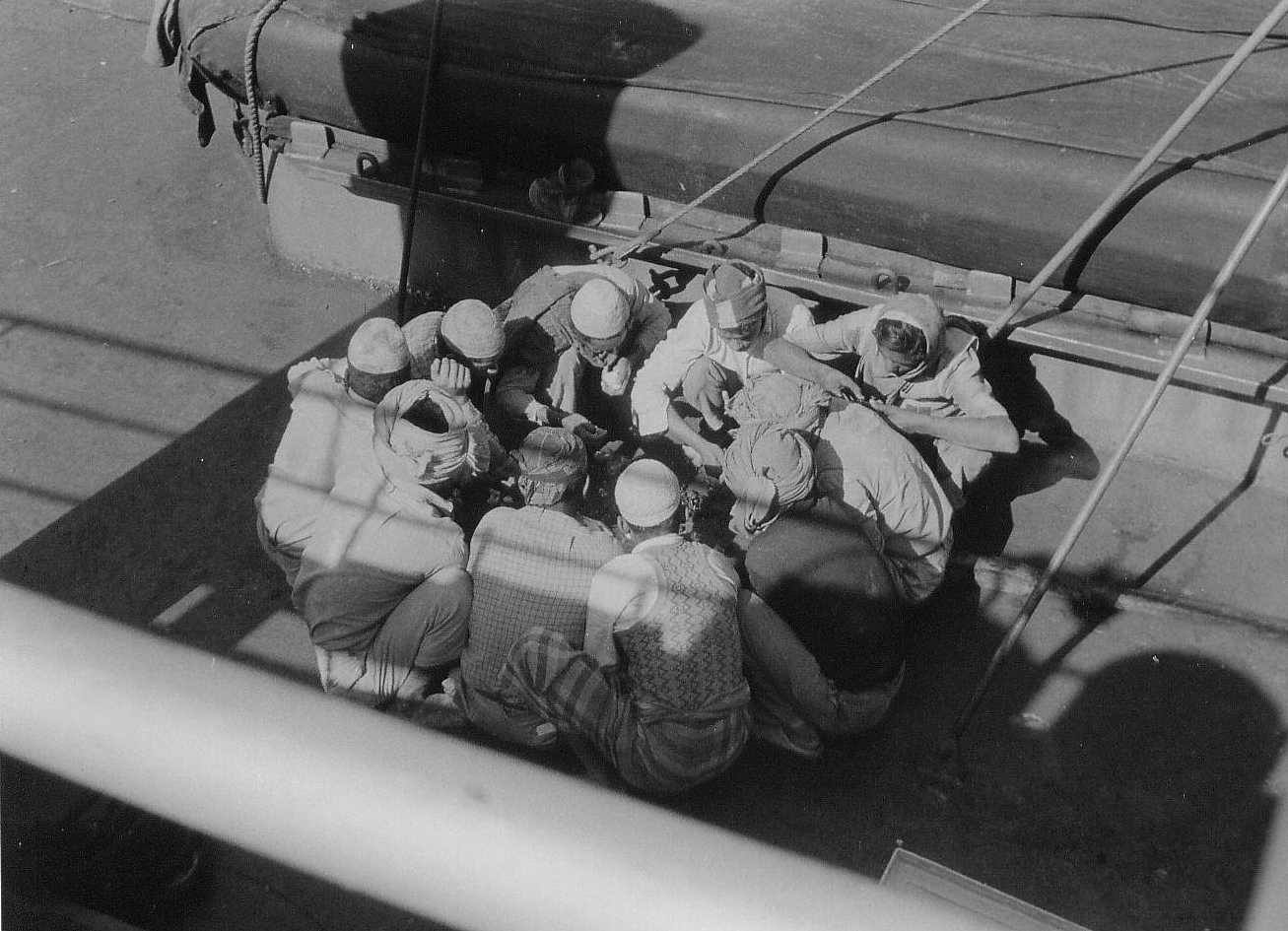
Arab port workers aboard a cargo ship during their common lunch, 1958

In West Asia (Middle East) and in most Arab countries, lunch is eaten after noon, usually between 1:00 pm and 4:00 pm and is the main meal of the day. It usually consists of meat, rice, vegetables and sauces and is sometimes but not always followed by dessert. Lunch is also eaten as a light meal at times in the Middle East, such as when children arrive at home from school while the parents are still out working.

Water is commonly served, which may be iced. Other beverages such as soft drinks or yogurt (solid or liquid), other drinks are also consumed.

== North America ==
In the United States and Canada, lunch is usually a moderately sized meal generally eaten between 11:00 am and 1:00 pm. During the work week, options for meal-types in North America could include some type of sandwich, soup, or leftovers from the previous night's dinner (e.g., rice or pasta) or anything at the discretion of the individual on an ad hoc basis if in an urban setting choosing from a nearby menu, which could include the liquid lunch.

Children often bring packed lunches to school, which might consist of a sandwich such as bologna (or other cold cut) and cheese, tuna, chicken, or peanut butter and jelly, as well as in Canada, savoury pie, along with some fruit, chips, dessert and a drink such as juice, milk, or water. They may also buy meals as provided by their school. Adults may leave work to go out for a quick lunch, which might include some type of hot or cold sandwich such as a hamburger or "sub" sandwich. Salads and soups are also common, as well as a soup and sandwich, tacos, burritos, sushi, bento boxes, and pizza.

Lunch may be consumed at various types of restaurants, such as formal, fast casual and fast food restaurants. Canadians and Americans generally do not go home for lunch, and lunch rarely lasts more than an hour except for business lunches, which may last longer. In the United States, the three-martini lunch – so called because the meal extends to the amount of time it takes to drink three martinis – has been making a comeback since 2010.

In the United States, businesses could deduct 80% of the cost of these extended lunches until the Tax Cuts and Jobs Act of 2017. Children generally are given a break in the middle of the school day to eat lunch. Public schools often have a cafeteria where children can buy lunch or eat a packed lunch. Boarding schools and private schools, including universities, often have a cafeteria where lunch is served.

In Mexico, lunch (almuerzo) is usually the main meal of the day and normally takes place between 2:00 pm and 4:00 pm. It usually includes three or four courses: the first is an entrée of rice, noodles or pasta, but also may include a soup or salad. The second consists of a main dish, called a guisado, served with one or two side dishes such as refried beans, cooked vegetables, rice or salad. The main dish is accompanied by tortillas or a bread called bolillo. The third course is a combination of a traditional dessert or sweet, café de olla, and a digestif. During the meal, it is usual to drink aguas frescas, although soft drinks have gained ground in recent years.

== South America ==
In Argentina, lunch is usually the main meal of the day, and normally takes place between noon and 2:00 p.m. People usually eat a wide variety of foods, (Note: "Lunch and dinner are both hearty and for prosperous urban families may include a soup, an order of cold meat, a main course of meat with potatoes and green vegetables, a salad, and a dessert.") such as chicken, beef, pasta, salads, and a drink like water, soda or wine, and some dessert. Although at work, people usually take a fast meal which can consist of a sandwich brought from home or purchased as fast food.

In Brazil, lunch is the main meal of the day, (Note: "In most of Brazil, the big meal of the day is served at noon.") taking place between 11:30 a.m. and 2:00 p.m. Brazilians usually eat rice with beans, salad, french fries, some kind of meat or pasta dishes, with juice or soft drinks. The kind of food may vary from region to region. Fast and simpler meals (sandwich, etc.) are common during weekdays. After the meal, some kind of dessert or coffee are also common.

== See also ==
- Break (work)
- Free lunch
- Lunch box
- Lunch counter
- Lunch lady
- Lunch meat
- Mahlzeit (German salutation)
- National School Lunch Act
- Plate lunch
- No such thing as a free lunch
