= Right of Children to Free and Compulsory Education Act, 2009 =

Children's rights in India

Parliament of India
- Long title: An Act to provide for free and compulsory education to all the children of the age of six to fourteen years.
- Citation: Act No. 35 of 2009
- Enacted by: Parliament of India
- Assented to: 26 August 2009
- Commenced: 1 April 2010

Related legislation
- 86th Amendment (2002)
- Status: In force

The Right of Children to Free and Compulsory Education Act, 2009, commonly known as the Right to Education Act (RTE), is a legislation enacted by the Parliament of India on 4 August 2009. It provides for free and compulsory education to all children aged 6 to 14 years in India, in accordance with Article 21A of the Constitution of India. The Act came into effect on 1 April 2010, making India one of 135 countries to recognise education as a fundamental right for every child.

== History ==
Article 21A, introduced by the 86th Amendment to the Constitution of India in 2002, made education a fundamental right. However, the amendment did not specify the manner of implementation, instead stating that enabling legislation would be required.

The first draft of the bill was prepared in 2005 to outline practical measures for implementation of the right. It generated controversy due to a provision mandating the reservation of 25% of seats in private schools for children from disadvantaged backgrounds, among other groups. The sub-committee of the Central Advisory Board of Education, which prepared the draft, considered this provision essential for fostering a democratic and egalitarian society. Earlier, the Law Commission of India had recommended a 50% reservation for disadvantaged students in private schools.

The enactment of the Right to Education (RTE) Act marked a shift towards a rights-based approach, placing a legal obligation on both the Central and State Governments to ensure the implementation of this right in accordance with the Act's provisions.

== Precedents ==
The Right of Children to Free and Compulsory Education Act (RTE) is not without precedent. At the time of drafting the Constitution, the idea of universal adult franchise faced opposition, as a significant portion of the population was illiterate. Nonetheless, the framers of the Constitution recognised the importance of education and included Article 45 in the Directive Principles of State Policy:

"The State shall endeavour to provide, within a period of ten years from the commencement of this Constitution, for free and compulsory education for all children until they complete the age of fourteen years."

As this deadline passed without fulfilment, several decades later, the then Education Minister, M. C. Chagla, remarked:

"Our Constitution fathers did not intend that we just set up hovels, put students there, give untrained teachers, give them bad textbooks, no playgrounds, and say, we have complied with Article 45 and primary education is expanding... They meant that real education should be given to our children between the ages of 6 and 14." — M. C. Chagla, 1964

During the 1990s, with support from the World Bank, efforts were made to establish schools accessible to rural communities. These initiatives were later consolidated under the Sarva Shiksha Abhiyan, a flagship programme aimed at achieving universal elementary education. The RTE Act builds upon these earlier efforts by making the enrolment of children in schools a legal obligation of the State.

== Passage ==
The bill was approved by the Union Cabinet on 2 July 2009. It was passed by the Rajya Sabha on 20 July 2009 and subsequently by the Lok Sabha on 4 August 2009. The bill received Presidential assent and was notified as law on 26 August 2009, under the title The Right of Children to Free and Compulsory Education Act, 2009. The Act came into force across India, except in the state of Jammu and Kashmir, on 1 April 2010.

While introducing the legislation, the then Prime Minister, Manmohan Singh, stated:

"We are committed to ensuring that all children, irrespective of gender and social category, have access to education—an education that enables them to acquire the skills, knowledge, values and attitudes necessary to become responsible and active citizens of India."

== Highlights ==
The Right of Children to Free and Compulsory Education Act (RTE) provides every child the right to free and compulsory education until the completion of elementary education in a neighbourhood school. The Act clarifies that "compulsory education" refers to the obligation of the appropriate government to ensure free and compulsory admission, attendance, and completion of elementary education for every child between the ages of 6 and 14 years. The term "free" implies that no child shall be required to pay any fee, charge, or expense that may hinder their ability to pursue and complete elementary education.

=== Admission and access to education ===
The Act mandates regular surveys to identify children in need of education and to ensure that suitable facilities are established in every neighbourhood to meet this requirement. According to Sam Carlson, the World Bank's education specialist for India:

"The RTE Act is the first legislation in the world that places the responsibility of ensuring enrolment, attendance, and completion on the Government. In the United States and other countries, it is the parents’ responsibility to send children to school."

The Act also stipulates that newly admitted children must be placed in age-appropriate classes.

=== Implementation framework ===
The Act outlines the duties and responsibilities of governments, local authorities, and parents in ensuring free and compulsory education. It also provides for the sharing of financial and administrative responsibilities between the central and state governments.

It mandates the formation of School Management Committees (SMCs) in all government and aided schools to facilitate community and parental participation in school governance. It also establishes monitoring and accountability mechanisms. A 14-member National Advisory Council (NAC) was constituted to oversee the implementation of the Act.

=== Quality standards ===
The RTE Act prescribes norms and standards related to pupil-teacher ratios (PTRs), school buildings and infrastructure, number of working days for schools, and working hours for teachers. It mandates the appointment of an adequate number of trained and qualified teachers and requires that PTRs be maintained at the level of each individual school, rather than averaged across districts or states, to prevent urban-rural disparities in teacher distribution.

Teachers are prohibited from being assigned non-educational duties, except for activities such as the decennial census, elections to local bodies and legislatures, and disaster relief operations.

The Act calls for the development of curricula in line with constitutional values, aimed at the holistic development of children. It emphasises learning that builds on the child's knowledge, potential, and talents, and promotes a system that is free of fear, trauma, and anxiety through child-friendly and child-centred education.

=== Child-friendly provisions ===
The Act explicitly prohibits the following:

- Physical punishment and mental harassment
- Screening procedures for admission
- Collection of capitation fees
- Private tuition by teachers
- Operation of unrecognised schools

While the RTE Act covers the right to education for children aged 6 to 14, the rights of children with disabilities to free education up to the age of 18 are addressed under the Persons with Disabilities Act. The RTE Act also includes provisions to improve school infrastructure, teacher-student ratios, and faculty qualifications.

== Amendments ==
The Right of Children to Free and Compulsory Education Act (RTE) has undergone several amendments since its enactment, aimed at improving implementation and addressing evolving educational needs.

In 2017, an amendment extended the deadline for unqualified teachers to acquire the necessary professional qualifications. This amendment emphasised teacher training through distance learning, aiming to improve the quality of teaching in government and private schools.

The 2019 amendment removed the no-detention policy, thereby allowing state governments to reintroduce examinations in Classes 5 and 8. Under the revised provisions, students who fail these examinations may be detained, provided that they are first given remedial instruction and the opportunity to appear for a re-examination.

On 7 May 2014, the Supreme Court of India ruled that the provisions of the RTE Act do not apply to minority educational institutions, thereby exempting them from certain requirements under the Act.

In 2011, the government took an in-principle decision to extend the right to education up to Class X (age 16) and to include preschool education within its ambit. However, in subsequent years, the government's policy emphasis shifted towards the development and implementation of a new National Education Policy (NEP) rather than expanding the scope of the RTE Act.

The NEP 2020 proposes further reforms, including the possible extension of the RTE framework to cover early childhood care and education (ages 3–6) as well as secondary education. It also stresses the integration of digital learning, vocational training, and other innovations to address contemporary educational challenges.

== Status of implementation and funding ==
=== Significant achievements ===
The Right of Children to Free and Compulsory Education Act (RTE), implemented in 2010, has made significant contributions to India's education system. Notable achievements include:

- Increased Enrolment, Reduced Dropout Rates, and Narrowing of Gender Gaps: Overall school enrolment reached 97.2% by 2018. There was a marked increase in the enrolment of girls in both primary and secondary education.
- Improved Infrastructure: The enforcement of infrastructure norms led to improved school facilities. For instance, the proportion of schools with usable girls' toilets doubled to 66.4% by 2018. Recruitment and training of teachers were also enhanced, leading to improved quality of education delivery.
- Inclusion of Disadvantaged Groups: More than 3.3 million students were admitted under the 25% reservation for children from economically weaker sections and disadvantaged groups.

=== Continued policy implementation gap ===
Despite the above gains, significant gaps remain in the implementation of the Act. As per public estimates based on UDISE+ 2019–20 data, only 25.5% of schools complied with all infrastructure norms under the RTE Act. Compliance rates ranged from 63.6% in Punjab to as low as 1.3% in Meghalaya. Furthermore, regularly updated RTE compliance data is no longer made publicly available.

The Ministry of Human Resource Development had released periodic reports on the status of implementation, including a report on the first anniversary of the Act and subsequent updates till 2015. These reports noted that 1.7 million children between the ages of 6 and 14 remained out of school, and there was a shortage of approximately 508,000 teachers across the country.

A shadow report released by the National RTE Forum—a coalition of leading education networks led by activist Ambarish Rai —challenged the government's findings, highlighting delays in fulfilling several key legal commitments. The Supreme Court of India has intervened at various points to ensure implementation of the Act. The Act has also served as a legal basis for enforcing pay parity between teachers in government and government-aided schools.

=== Challenges to implementation ===
One of the primary barriers to effective implementation is the insufficient investment by both central and state governments in upgrading schools to meet RTE standards. India continues to allocate less than 4% of its GDP to education, falling short of the globally recommended minimum for achieving Sustainable Development Goal 4 (SDG 4) and Education for All (EFA) targets.

As education is a concurrent subject under the Indian Constitution, both the Centre and the States have legislative powers. However, many state governments have argued that they lack the financial capacity to provide education of the required standard across all schools.

A committee tasked with estimating funding requirements projected a need of ₹1710 billion (₹1.71 trillion or approximately US$38.2 billion) over five years. In April 2010, the central government agreed to bear 65% of the cost, with states covering 35%, and a 90:10 ratio for north-eastern states. This estimate was later revised to ₹2,310 billion, with the Centre increasing its share to 68%. Despite these agreements, actual budgetary allocations for education have remained inadequate, particularly in the aftermath of the COVID-19 pandemic.

=== Inter-state variation ===
The implementation of the RTE Act varies considerably across states. For example, the Government of Haryana assigned the responsibilities of implementation and monitoring to Block Elementary Education Officers–cum–Block Resource Coordinators (BEEOs-cum-BRCs) to ensure effective execution of the Act at the grassroots level.

== Criticism ==
The Right of Children to Free and Compulsory Education Act (RTE) has attracted criticism on multiple grounds, including concerns over its drafting process, lack of consultation, inadequate focus on quality, and its impact on private and minority-run schools. It has also been criticised for excluding children under six years of age from its purview.

Some critics argue that many of the Act's provisions simply extend existing government programmes such as the Sarva Shiksha Abhiyan from the 2000s and the District Primary Education Programme (DPEP) of the 1990s, both of which have been criticised for inefficiency and allegations of corruption.

=== Failure to provide uniform quality standards ===
The Act has been criticised for institutionalising inequality by failing to ensure uniform quality standards across all schools in India. Prominent educationist Anil Sadgopal stated:

"It is a fraud on our children. It gives neither free education nor compulsory education. In fact, it only legitimises the present multi-layered, inferior-quality school education system where discrimination shall continue to prevail."

Entrepreneur and author Gurcharan Das highlighted that 54% of urban children attend private schools, with the figure growing at 3% annually. He remarked, "Even poor children are abandoning government schools. They are leaving because the teachers are not showing up." However, other researchers contend that perceived learning advantages in private schools often diminish when controlling for variables such as family income and parental literacy.

=== Public-private partnership and quota provisions ===
To address issues of access and quality, the Act includes provisions for compensating private schools that admit students under the 25% reservation quota for economically weaker sections. This approach has drawn comparisons to school voucher systems, where parents can choose between public and private institutions.

Organisations such as the All India Forum for Right to Education (AIF-RTE) have criticised this model, arguing that it reflects the state's withdrawal from its constitutional responsibility to provide universal elementary education.

=== Criticism from private schools ===
Given the perceived inadequacies in public education—such as teacher absenteeism, infrastructure deficiencies, and allegations of politically influenced appointments—low-cost private schools argue that they offer better value for money. In some states, average monthly salaries for rural private school teachers are reportedly as low as ₹4,000, compared to significantly higher government school salaries.

Supporters of private education argue that these schools serve marginalised children who face caste-based discrimination in public schools. However, critics contend that many low-fee private schools operate without official recognition due to non-compliance with quality standards, and their fee-based nature excludes the poorest families. As such, they are often viewed as catering to a relatively better-off rural elite.

In Writ Petition (Civil) No. 95 of 2010, the Society for Un-aided Private Schools, Rajasthan, along with 31 other private school associations, petitioned the Supreme Court of India, contending that the RTE Act violated the constitutional right of private entities to manage their institutions without state interference. The petitioners specifically challenged the constitutionality of the 25% reservation mandate in unaided private schools.

On 12 April 2012, a three-judge bench of the Supreme Court delivered a 2–1 judgement. Chief Justice S. H. Kapadia and Justice Swatanter Kumar upheld the validity of the reservation, ruling that it was not unconstitutional. However, they excluded private minority institutions and boarding schools from the purview of the Act. Justice K. S. Panicker Radhakrishnan dissented, holding that the Act could not apply to private unaided schools—minority or otherwise—that did not receive government aid.

In September 2012, the Supreme Court declined to admit a review petition challenging the verdict.

=== Implementation issues and case law ===
There is a growing body of case law surrounding RTE implementation across various states. In May 2016, for instance, Maharishi Vidya Mandir, a CBSE-affiliated school in Chetpet, Tamil Nadu, was accused of deliberately bypassing the 25% quota provision. Reports alleged that school authorities rejected applications from economically weaker families, claimed that the RTE Act "does not exist," and disqualified candidates based on lack of email addresses or falsified distance criteria to avoid compliance.

In 2017, a public interest litigation was filed in the High Courts of Andhra Pradesh and Telangana, seeking effective implementation of the 25% quota provision. The courts directed both state governments to take necessary action to ensure compliance.

=== Barriers for orphans and documentation requirements ===
Although the RTE Act allows for the admission of children without documentation, several states have continued to insist on proof such as income certificates, caste certificates, BPL cards, and birth certificates. These procedural requirements often pose barriers for orphaned children, who may be unable to furnish such documents despite being eligible under the Act.
