= Cheta, SBS Nagar =

Cheta
- Village
- Location in Punjab, India Cheta (India)
- Coordinates: 31.2633924°N 75.8333551°E
- Country: India
- State: Punjab
- District: Shaheed Bhagat Singh Nagar

Government
  - Type: Panchayat raj
  - Body: Gram panchayat
- Elevation: 251 m (823 ft)

Population (2011)
  - Total: 922
- Sex ratio 474/448 ♂/♀

Languages
  - Official: Punjabi
- Time zone: UTC+5:30 (IST)
- Telephone code: 01884
- ISO 3166 code: IN-PB
- Website: nawanshahr.nic.in

Cheta is a village in Shaheed Bhagat Singh Nagar district of Punjab State, India. It is located 14.8 kilometres (9.2 mi) away from Banga, 17.2 kilometres (10.7 mi) from Phagwara, 26 kilometres (16 mi) from district headquarter Shaheed Bhagat Singh Nagar and 118 kilometres (73 mi) from state capital Chandigarh. The village is administrated by Sarpanch an elected representative of the village.

== Demography ==
As of 2011, Cheta has a total number of 200 houses and population of 922 of which 474 include are males while 448 are females according to the report published by Census India in 2011. The literacy rate of Cheta is 83.21%, higher than the state average of 75.84%. The population of children under the age of 6 years is 94 which is 10.20% of total population of Cheta, and child sex ratio is approximately 843 as compared to Punjab state average of 846.

Most of the people are from Schedule Caste which constitutes 42.30% of total population in Cheta. The town does not have any Schedule Tribe population so far.

As per the report published by Census India in 2011, 328 people were engaged in work activities out of the total population of Cheta which includes 300 males and 28 females. According to census survey report 2011, 95.12% workers describe their work as main work and 4.88% workers are involved in Marginal activity providing livelihood for less than 6 months.

== Education ==
The village has a Punjabi medium, co-ed upper primary school founded in 1976. The schools provide mid-day meal as per Indian Midday Meal Scheme and the meal prepared in school premises. As per Right of Children to Free and Compulsory Education Act the school provide free education to children between the ages of 6 and 14.

KC Engineering College and Doaba Khalsa Trust Group Of Institutions are the nearest colleges. Industrial Training Institute for women (ITI Nawanshahr) is 5 kilometres (3.1 mi) away from the village. Lovely Professional University is 24 kilometres (15 mi) away from the village.

== Transport ==
Banga railway station is the nearest train station however, Phagwara Junction railway station is 18 kilometres (11 mi) away from the village. Sahnewal Airport is the nearest domestic airport which located 68 kilometres (42 mi) away in Ludhiana and the nearest international airport is located in Chandigarh also Sri Guru Ram Dass Jee International Airport is the second nearest airport which is 170 kilometres (110 mi) away in Amritsar.

== See also ==
- List of villages in India
