= Jhander Kalan =

- Village
- Location in Punjab, India Jhander Kalan (India)
- Coordinates: 31.2117947°N 75.9216852°E
- Country: India
- State: Punjab
- District: Shaheed Bhagat Singh Nagar

Government
  - Type: Panchayat raj
  - Body: Gram panchayat
- Elevation: 251 m (823 ft)

Population (2011)
  - Total: 846
- Sex ratio 432/414 ♂/♀

Languages
  - Official: Punjabi
- Time zone: UTC+5:30 (IST)
- PIN: 144505
- Telephone code: 01884
- ISO 3166 code: IN-PB
- Post office: Banga
- Website: nawanshahr.nic.in

Jhander Kalan is a village in Shaheed Bhagat Singh Nagar district of Punjab State, India. Kalan is a Persian word for big and Khurd is a Persian word for small, when two villages have the same name they are distinguished by using Kalan or Khurd with the village name. It is located 9.2 kilometres (5.7 mi) away from postal head office Banga, 23 kilometres (14 mi) from Phagwara, 20 kilometres (12 mi) from district headquarter Shaheed Bhagat Singh Nagar and 113 kilometres (70 mi) from state capital Chandigarh. The village is administrated by Sarpanch an elected representative of the village.

== Demography ==
As of 2011, Jhander Kalan has a total number of 184 houses and population of 846 of which 432 include are males while 414 are females according to the report published by Census India in 2011. The literacy rate of Jhander Kalan is 85.49%, higher than the state average of 75.84%. The population of children under the age of 6 years is 74 which is 8.75% of total population of Jhander Kalan, and child sex ratio is approximately 1114 as compared to Punjab state average of 846.

Most of the people are from Schedule Caste which constitutes 49.05% of total population in Jhander Kalan. The town does not have any Schedule Tribe population so far.

As per the report published by Census India in 2011, 276 people were engaged in work activities out of the total population of Jhander Kalan which includes 257 males and 19 females. According to census survey report 2011, 98.91% workers describe their work as main work and 1.09% workers are involved in Marginal activity providing livelihood for less than 6 months.

== Education ==
The village has a Punjabi medium, co-ed upper primary with secondary school founded in 1967. The schools provide mid-day meal as per Indian Midday Meal Scheme and the meal prepared in school premises. As per Right of Children to Free and Compulsory Education Act the school provide free education to children between the ages of 6 and 14.

Amardeep Singh Shergill Memorial college Mukandpur and Sikh National College Banga are the nearest colleges. Lovely Professional University is 26 kilometres (16 mi) away from the village.

List of schools nearby:

- Sat Modern Public School, Mangat Dingrian
- Guru Teg Bahadur Model School, Behram
- Guru Ram Dass Public School, Cheta
- Lovely Public School, Pathlawa

== Transport ==
Banga railway station is the nearest train station however, Phagwara Junction railway station is 19.7 kilometres (12.2 mi) away from the village. Sahnewal Airport is the nearest domestic airport which located 69 kilometres (43 mi) away in Ludhiana and the nearest international airport is located in Chandigarh also Sri Guru Ram Dass Jee International Airport is the second nearest airport which is 136 kilometres (85 mi) away in Amritsar.

== See also ==
- List of villages in India
