= Nai Mazara =

- Village
- Location in Punjab, India Nai Mazara (India)
- Coordinates: 31.0951678°N 76.1963545°E
- Country: India
- State: Punjab
- District: Shaheed Bhagat Singh Nagar

Government
  - Type: Panchayat raj
  - Body: Gram panchayat
- Elevation: 356 m (1,168 ft)

Population (2011)
  - Total: 995
- Sex ratio 471/474 ♂/♀

Languages
  - Official: Punjabi
- Time zone: UTC+5:30 (IST)
- PIN: 144516
- Telephone code: 01823
- ISO 3166 code: IN-PB
- Post office: Kishanpura (B.O)
- Website: nawanshahr.nic.in

Nai Mazara is a village in Shaheed Bhagat Singh Nagar district of Punjab State, India. It is located 1.4 kilometres (0.87 mi) away from branch post office Kishanpura, 9.6 kilometres (6.0 mi) from Nawanshahr, 17.7 kilometres (11.0 mi) from district headquarter Shaheed Bhagat Singh Nagar and 82 kilometres (51 mi) from state capital Chandigarh. The village is administrated by Sarpanch an elected representative of the village.

== Demography ==
As of 2011, Nai Mazara has a total number of 190 houses and population of 945 of which 471 include are males while 474 are females according to the report published by Census India in 2011. The literacy rate of Nai Mazara is 84.30% lower than the state average of 75.84%. The population of children under the age of 6 years is 85 which is 8.99% of total population of Nai Mazara, and child sex ratio is approximately 889 as compared to Punjab state average of 846.

Most of the people are from Schedule Caste which constitutes 49.63% of total population in Nai Mazara. The town does not have any Schedule Tribe population so far.

As per the report published by Census India in 2011, 248 people were engaged in work activities out of the total population of Nai Mazara which includes 233 males and 15 females. According to census survey report 2011, 87.90% workers describe their work as main work and 12.10% workers are involved in Marginal activity providing livelihood for less than 6 months.

== Education ==
The village has a Punjabi medium, co-ed upper primary school established in 1996. The school provide mid-day meal as per Indian Midday Meal Scheme. As per Right of Children to Free and Compulsory Education Act the school provide free education to children between the ages of 6 and 14.

KC Engineering College and Doaba Khalsa Trust Group Of Institutions are the nearest colleges. Industrial Training Institute for women (ITI Nawanshahr) is 7 kilometres (4.3 mi). The village is 63 kilometres (39 mi) away from Chandigarh University, 40 kilometres (25 mi) from Indian Institute of Technology and 52 kilometres (32 mi) away from Lovely Professional University.

List of schools nearby:

- Dashmesh Model School, Kahma
- Govt Primary School, Kahlon
- Govt High School, Garcha

== Transport ==
Nawanshahr train station is the nearest train station however, Garhshankar Junction railway station is 19 kilometres (12 mi) away from the village. Sahnewal Airport is the nearest domestic airport which located 60.8 kilometres (37.8 mi) away in Ludhiana and the nearest international airport is located in Chandigarh also Sri Guru Ram Dass Jee International Airport is the second nearest airport which is 161 kilometres (100 mi) away in Amritsar.

== See also ==
- List of villages in India
