= Kang, SBS Nagar =

Kang
- Village
- Location in Punjab, India Kang (India)
- Coordinates: 31.0619502°N 76.0667502°E
- Country: India
- State: Punjab
- District: Shaheed Bhagat Singh Nagar

Government
  - Type: Panchayat raj
  - Body: Gram panchayat
- Elevation: 254 m (833 ft)

Population (2011)
  - Total: 972
- Sex ratio 505/467 ♂/♀

Languages
  - Official: Punjabi
- Time zone: UTC+5:30 (IST)
- PIN: 144518
- Telephone code: 01823
- ISO 3166 code: IN-PB
- Post office: Garcha
- Website: nawanshahr.nic.in

Kang is a village in Shaheed Bhagat Singh Nagar district of Punjab State, India. Located 3.6 kilometres (2.2 mi) from the postal head office Garcha, 12 kilometres (7.5 mi) from Nawanshahr, 5.6 kilometres (3.5 mi) from district headquarter Shaheed Bhagat Singh Nagar and 94 kilometres (58 mi) from state capital Chandigarh. The village is controlled by a sarpanch, an elected representative of the village.

== Demography ==
As of 2011, Kang has a total number of 201 houses and a population of 972 people (505 males & 467 females) according to the report published by Census India in 2011. The literacy rate of Kang is 81.01%, higher than the state average of 75.84%. The population of children under the age of 6 years is 82, making up 8.44% of the total population of Kang, and child sex ratio is approximately 952 as compared to Punjab state average of 846.

Most of the people are from Schedule Caste which constitutes 35.91% of the total population in Kang. The town does not have any Schedule Tribe population so far.

As per the report published by Census India in 2011, 487 people were engaged in work activities out of the total population of Kang which includes 313 males and 174 females. According to census survey report 2011, 91.79% of workers describe their work as main work and 8.21% of workers are involved in Marginal activity providing livelihood for less than 6 months.

== Education ==
The village has a Punjabi medium, co-ed upper primary school established in 1987. The school provides mid-day meal as per Indian Midday Meal Scheme. As per Right of Children to Free and Compulsory Education Act the school provides free education to children between the ages of 6 and 14.

KC Engineering College and Doaba Khalsa Trust Group Of Institutions are the nearest colleges. Industrial Training Institute for women (ITI Nawanshahr) is 14 kilometres (8.7 mi). The village is 70 kilometres (43 mi) away from Chandigarh University, 53 kilometres (33 mi) from Indian Institute of Technology and 48 kilometres (30 mi) away from Lovely Professional University.

List of schools nearby:

- Dashmesh Model School, Kahma
- Govt Primary School, Kahlon
- Govt High School, Garcha

== Transport ==
Nawanshahr railway station is the nearest train station however, Garhshankar Junction railway station is 24 kilometres (15 mi) away from the village. Sahnewal Airport is the nearest domestic airport which located 52 kilometres (32 mi) away in Ludhiana and the nearest international airport is located in Chandigarh also Sri Guru Ram Dass Jee International Airport is the second nearest airport which is 157 kilometres (98 mi) away in Amritsar.

== See also ==
- List of villages in India
