= Majhoor =

- Village
- Location in Punjab, India Majhoor (India)
- Coordinates: 31.0445833°N 76.21281°E
- Country: India
- State: Punjab
- District: Shaheed Bhagat Singh Nagar

Government
  - Type: Panchayat raj
  - Body: Gram panchayat
- Elevation: 355 m (1,165 ft)

Population (2011)
  - Total: 724
- Sex ratio 366/358 ♂/♀

Languages
  - Official: Punjabi
- Time zone: UTC+5:30 (IST)
- PIN: 144515
- Telephone code: 01823
- ISO 3166 code: IN-PB
- Post office: Jadla (S.O)
- Website: nawanshahr.nic.in

Majhoor is a village in Shaheed Bhagat Singh Nagar district of Punjab State, India. It is located 5.2 kilometres (3.2 mi) away from sub post office Jadla, 16.3 kilometres (10.1 mi) from Nawanshahr, 21 kilometres (13 mi) from district headquarter Shaheed Bhagat Singh Nagar and 82 kilometres (51 mi) from state capital Chandigarh. The village is administrated by Sarpanch an elected representative of the village.

== Demography ==
As of 2011, Majhoor has a total number of 143 houses and population of 724 of which 366 include are males while 358 are females according to the report published by Census India in 2011. The literacy rate of Majhoor is 78.21%, higher than the state average of 75.84%. The population of children under the age of 6 years is 63 which is 8.70% of total population of Majhoor, and child sex ratio is approximately 750 as compared to Punjab state average of 846.

Most of the people are from Schedule Caste which constitutes 41.30% of total population in Majhoor. The town does not have any Schedule Tribe population so far.

As per the report published by Census India in 2011, 229 people were engaged in work activities out of the total population of Majhoor which includes 183 males and 46 females. According to census survey report 2011, 87.34% workers describe their work as main work and 12.66% workers are involved in Marginal activity providing livelihood for less than 6 months.

== Education ==
The village has a Punjabi medium, co-ed upper primary school established in 1977. The school provide mid-day meal as per Indian Midday Meal Scheme. As per Right of Children to Free and Compulsory Education Act the school provide free education to children between the ages of 6 and 14.

KC Engineering College and Doaba Khalsa Trust Group Of Institutions are the nearest colleges. Industrial Training Institute for women (ITI Nawanshahr) is 13 kilometres (8.1 mi). The village is 65 kilometres (40 mi) away from Chandigarh University, 42 kilometres (26 mi) from Indian Institute of Technology and 60 kilometres (37 mi) away from Lovely Professional University.

List of schools nearby:

- Dashmesh Model School, Kahma
- Govt Primary School, Kahlon
- Govt High School, Garcha

== Transport ==
Nawanshahr train station is the nearest train station however, Garhshankar Junction railway station is 24.8 kilometres (15.4 mi) away from the village. Sahnewal Airport is the nearest domestic airport which located 60 kilometres (37 mi) away in Ludhiana and the nearest international airport is located in Chandigarh also Sri Guru Ram Dass Jee International Airport is the second nearest airport which is 164 kilometres (102 mi) away in Amritsar.

== See also ==
- List of villages in India
