= Malakpur, SBS Nagar =

Malakpur
- Village
- Location in Punjab, India Malakpur (India)
- Coordinates: 31.0228438°N 76.2228804°E
- Country: India
- State: Punjab
- District: Shaheed Bhagat Singh Nagar

Government
  - Type: Panchayat raj
  - Body: Gram panchayat
- Elevation: 355 m (1,165 ft)

Population (2011)
  - Total: 353
- Sex ratio 190/163 ♂/♀

Languages
  - Official: Punjabi
- Time zone: UTC+5:30 (IST)
- PIN: 144515
- Telephone code: 01823
- ISO 3166 code: IN-PB
- Post office: Dangarpur (B.O)
- Website: nawanshahr.nic.in

Malakpur is a village in Shaheed Bhagat Singh Nagar district of Punjab State, India. It is located 17 kilometres (11 mi) away from branch post office Balachaur, 19.5 kilometres (12.1 mi) from Nawanshahr, 24 kilometres (15 mi) from district headquarter Shaheed Bhagat Singh Nagar and 85 kilometres (53 mi) from state capital Chandigarh. The village is administrated by Sarpanch an elected representative of the village.

== Demography ==
As of 2011, Malakpur has a total number of 73 houses and population of 353 of which 190 include are males while 163 are females according to the report published by Census India in 2011. The literacy rate of Malakpur is 92.24%, higher than the state average of 75.84%. The population of children under the age of 6 years is 31 which is 8.78% of total population of Malakpur, and child sex ratio is approximately 1067 as compared to Punjab state average of 846.

Most of the people are from Schedule Caste which constitutes 3.68% of total population in Malakpur. The town does not have any Schedule Tribe population so far.

As per the report published by Census India in 2011, 132 people were engaged in work activities out of the total population of Malakpur which includes 108 males and 24 females. According to census survey report 2011, 69.70% workers describe their work as main work and 30.30% workers are involved in Marginal activity providing livelihood for less than 6 months.

== Education ==
KC Engineering College and Doaba Khalsa Trust Group Of Institutions are the nearest colleges. Industrial Training Institute for women (ITI Nawanshahr) is 16.9 kilometres (10.5 mi). The village is 69 kilometres (43 mi) away from Chandigarh University, 45 kilometres (28 mi) from Indian Institute of Technology and 62 kilometres (39 mi) away from Lovely Professional University.

List of schools nearby:

- Dashmesh Model School, Kahma
- Govt Primary School, Kahlon
- Govt High School, Garcha

== Transport ==
Nawanshahr train station is the nearest train station however, Garhshankar Junction railway station is 28 kilometres (17 mi) away from the village. Sahnewal Airport is the nearest domestic airport which located 63 kilometres (39 mi) away in Ludhiana and the nearest international airport is located in Chandigarh also Sri Guru Ram Dass Jee International Airport is the second nearest airport which is 171 kilometres (106 mi) away in Amritsar.

== See also ==
- List of villages in India
