= Mandhala =

- Village
- Location in Punjab, India Mandhala (India)
- Coordinates: 31.015872°N 76.1944568°E
- Country: India
- State: Punjab
- District: Shaheed Bhagat Singh Nagar

Government
  - Type: Panchayat raj
  - Body: Gram panchayat

Population (2011)
  - Total: 99
- Sex ratio 49/50 ♂/♀

Languages
  - Official: Punjabi
- Time zone: UTC+5:30 (IST)
- PIN: 144515
- ISO 3166 code: IN-PB
- Post office: Dangarpur (B.O)
- Website: nawanshahr.nic.in

Mandhala is a village in Shaheed Bhagat Singh Nagar district of Punjab State, India. It is located 18 kilometres (11 mi) away from Balachaur, 19.6 kilometres (12.2 mi) from Nawanshahr, 22.3 kilometres (13.9 mi) from district headquarter Shaheed Bhagat Singh Nagar and 86 kilometres (53 mi) from state capital Chandigarh. The village is administrated by Sarpanch an elected representative of the village.

== Demography ==
As of 2011, Mandhala has a total number of 21 houses and population of 99 of which 49 include are males while 50 are females according to the report published by Census India in 2011. The literacy rate of Mandhala is 75.61%, lower than the state average of 75.84%. The population of children under the age of 6 years is 17 which is 17.17% of total population of Mandhala, and child sex ratio is approximately 1125 as compared to Punjab state average of 846.

Most of the people are from Schedule Caste which constitutes 50.17% of total population in Mandhala. The town does not have any Schedule Tribe population so far.

As per the report published by Census India in 2011, 193 people were engaged in work activities out of the total population of Mandhala which includes 172 males and 21 females. According to census survey report 2011, 41.46% workers describe their work as main work and 58.54% workers are involved in Marginal activity providing livelihood for less than 6 months.

== Education ==
KC Engineering College and Doaba Khalsa Trust Group Of Institutions are the nearest colleges. Industrial Training Institute for women (ITI Nawanshahr) is 17 kilometres (11 mi). The village is 77 kilometres (48 mi) away from Chandigarh University, 46 kilometres (29 mi) from Indian Institute of Technology and 64 kilometres (40 mi) away from Lovely Professional University.

List of schools nearby:

- Dashmesh Model School, Kahma
- Govt Primary School, Kahlon
- Govt High School, Garcha

== Transport ==
Nawanshahr train station is the nearest train station however, Garhshankar Junction railway station is 28.7 kilometres (17.8 mi) away from the village. Sahnewal Airport is the nearest domestic airport which located 48.4 kilometres (30.1 mi) away in Ludhiana and the nearest international airport is located in Chandigarh also Sri Guru Ram Dass Jee International Airport is the second nearest airport which is 172 kilometres (107 mi) away in Amritsar.

== See also ==
- List of villages in India
