= Mirpur Lakha =

- Village
- Location in Punjab, India Mirpur Lakha (India)
- Coordinates: 31.0877573°N 76.0077482°E
- Country: India
- State: Punjab
- District: Shaheed Bhagat Singh Nagar

Government
  - Type: Panchayat raj
  - Body: Gram panchayat
- Elevation: 254 m (833 ft)

Population (2011)
  - Total: 1,097
- Sex ratio 552/545 ♂/♀

Languages
  - Official: Punjabi
- Time zone: UTC+5:30 (IST)
- PIN: 144421
- Telephone code: 01823
- ISO 3166 code: IN-PB
- Post office: Mirpur Lakha (B.O)
- Website: nawanshahr.nic.in

Mirpur Lakha is a village in Shaheed Bhagat Singh Nagar district of Punjab State, India. It is located 14 kilometres (8.7 mi) away from Banga, 11 kilometres (6.8 mi) from Nawanshahr, 7.9 kilometres (4.9 mi) from district headquarter Shaheed Bhagat Singh Nagar and 102 kilometres (63 mi) from state capital Chandigarh. The village is administrated by Sarpanch an elected representative of the village.

== Demography ==
As of 2011, Mirpur Lakha has a total number of 241 houses and population of 1097 of which 552 include are males while 545 are females according to the report published by Census India in 2011. The literacy rate of Mirpur Lakha is 82.05% higher than the state average of 75.84%. The population of children under the age of 6 years is 122 which is 11.12% of total population of Mirpur Lakha, and child sex ratio is approximately 848 as compared to Punjab state average of 846.

Most of the people are from Schedule Caste which constitutes 41.20% of total population in Mirpur Lakha. The town does not have any Schedule Tribe population so far.

As per the report published by Census India in 2011, 289 people were engaged in work activities out of the total population of Mirpur Lakha which includes 268 males and 21 females. According to census survey report 2011, 97.92% workers describe their work as main work and 2.08% workers are involved in Marginal activity providing livelihood for less than 6 months.

Also importantly, according to the 2011 consensus, the location code of Mirpur Lakha is 032234.

== Education ==
The village has a Punjabi medium, co-ed upper primary school established in 1987. The school provide mid-day meal as per Indian Midday Meal Scheme. As per Right of Children to Free and Compulsory Education Act the school provide free education to children between the ages of 6 and 14.

KC Engineering College and Doaba Khalsa Trust Group Of Institutions are the nearest colleges. Industrial Training Institute for women (ITI Nawanshahr) is 13 kilometres (8.1 mi). The village is 78 kilometres (48 mi) away from Chandigarh University, 60 kilometres (37 mi) from Indian Institute of Technology and 40 kilometres (25 mi) away from Lovely Professional University.

List of schools nearby:

- Dashmesh Model School, Kahma
- Govt Primary School, Kahlon
- Govt High School, Garcha

== Transport ==
Nawanshahr train station is the nearest train station however, Garhshankar Junction railway station is 23.8 kilometres (14.8 mi) away from the village. Sahnewal Airport is the nearest domestic airport which located 54 kilometres (34 mi) away in Ludhiana and the nearest international airport is located in Chandigarh also Sri Guru Ram Dass Jee International Airport is the second nearest airport which is 153 kilometres (95 mi) away in Amritsar.

== See also ==
- List of villages in India
