= Mai Ditta =

- Village
- Location in Punjab, India Mai Ditta (India)
- Coordinates: 31.0881088°N 76.0016967°E
- Country: India
- State: Punjab
- District: Shaheed Bhagat Singh Nagar

Government
  - Type: Panchayat raj
  - Body: Gram panchayat
- Elevation: 254 m (833 ft)

Population (2011)
  - Total: 199
- Sex ratio 104/95 ♂/♀

Languages
  - Official: Punjabi
- Time zone: UTC+5:30 (IST)
- PIN: 144421
- Telephone code: 01823
- ISO 3166 code: IN-PB
- Post office: Mirpur Lakha (B.O)
- Website: nawanshahr.nic.in

Mai Ditta is a village in Shaheed Bhagat Singh Nagar district of Punjab State, India. It is located 600 meters away from branch post office Mirpur Lakha, 11.7 kilometres (7.3 mi) from Nawanshahr, 4.5 kilometres (2.8 mi) from district headquarter Shaheed Bhagat Singh Nagar and 103 kilometres (64 mi) from state capital Chandigarh. The village is administrated by Sarpanch an elected representative of the village.

== Demography ==
As of 2011, Mai Ditta has a total number of 41 houses and population of 199 of which 104 include are males while 95 are females according to the report published by Census India in 2011. The literacy rate of Mai Ditta is 77.09%, higher than the state average of 75.84%. The population of children under the age of 6 years is 20 which is 10.05% of total population of Mai Ditta, and child sex ratio is approximately 667 as compared to Punjab state average of 846.

As per the report published by Census India in 2011, 50 people were engaged in work activities out of the total population of Mai Ditta which includes 49 males and 1 females. According to census survey report 2011, 98% workers describe their work as main work and 2% workers are involved in Marginal activity providing livelihood for less than 6 months.

== Education ==
The village has a Punjabi medium, co-ed primary school The school provide mid-day meal as per Indian Midday Meal Scheme. As per Right of Children to Free and Compulsory Education Act the school provide free education to children between the ages of 6 and 14.

KC Engineering College and Doaba Khalsa Trust Group Of Institutions are the nearest colleges. Industrial Training Institute for women (ITI Nawanshahr) is 14 kilometres (8.7 mi). The village is 79 kilometres (49 mi) away from Chandigarh University, 61 kilometres (38 mi) from Indian Institute of Technology and 39 kilometres (24 mi) away from Lovely Professional University.

List of schools nearby:

- Dashmesh Model School, Kahma
- Govt Primary School, Kahlon
- Govt High School, Garcha

== Transport ==
Nawanshahr train station is the nearest train station however, Garhshankar Junction railway station is 24 kilometres (15 mi) away from the village. Sahnewal Airport is the nearest domestic airport which located 53 kilometres (33 mi) away in Ludhiana and the nearest international airport is located in Chandigarh also Sri Guru Ram Dass Jee International Airport is the second nearest airport which is 151 kilometres (94 mi) away in Amritsar.

== See also ==
- List of villages in India
