= Raksan =

- Village
- Location in Punjab, India Raksan (India)
- Coordinates: 31.0434136°N 76.2328676°E
- Country: India
- State: Punjab
- District: Shaheed Bhagat Singh Nagar

Government
  - Type: Panchayat raj
  - Body: Gram panchayat
- Elevation: 355 m (1,165 ft)

Population (2011)
  - Total: 505
- Sex ratio 247/258 ♂/♀

Languages
  - Official: Punjabi
- Time zone: UTC+5:30 (IST)
- PIN: 144515
- Telephone code: 01823
- ISO 3166 code: IN-PB
- Post office: Dangarpur (B.O)
- Website: nawanshahr.nic.in

Raksan is a village in Shaheed Bhagat Singh Nagar district of Punjab State, India. It is located 15.7 kilometres (9.8 mi) away from sub post office Balachaur, 17.5 kilometres (10.9 mi) from Nawanshahr, 22.7 kilometres (14.1 mi) from district headquarter Shaheed Bhagat Singh Nagar and 87.3 kilometres (54.2 mi) from state capital Chandigarh. The village is administrated by Sarpanch an elected representative of the village.

== Demography ==
As of 2011, Raksan has a total number of 107 houses and population of 505 of which 247 include are males while 258 are females according to the report published by Census India in 2011. The literacy rate of Raksan is 79.27% higher than the state average of 75.84%. The population of children under the age of 6 years is 66 which is 13.07% of total population of Raksan, and child sex ratio is approximately 1000 as compared to Punjab state average of 846.

Most of the people are from Schedule Caste which constitutes 21.78% of total population in Raksan. The town does not have any Schedule Tribe population so far.

As per the report published by Census India in 2011, 158 people were engaged in work activities out of the total population of Raksan which includes 131 males and 27 females. According to census survey report 2011, 81.01% workers describe their work as main work and 18.99% workers are involved in Marginal activity providing livelihood for less than 6 months.

== Education ==
The village has a Punjabi medium, co-ed primary school established in 1974. The school provide mid-day meal which prepared in school premisesas per Indian Midday Meal Scheme. As per Right of Children to Free and Compulsory Education Act the school provide free education to children between the ages of 6 and 14.

KC Engineering College and Doaba Khalsa Trust Group Of Institutions are the nearest colleges. Industrial Training Institute for women (ITI Nawanshahr) is 15 kilometres (9.3 mi). The village is 77 kilometres (48 mi) away from Chandigarh University, 43.6 kilometres (27.1 mi) from Indian Institute of Technology and 60.2 kilometres (37.4 mi) away from Lovely Professional University.

== Transport ==
Phagwara train station is the nearest train station however, Garhshankar Junction railway station is 26 kilometres (16 mi) away from the village. Sahnewal Airport is the nearest domestic airport which located 61 kilometres (38 mi) away in Ludhiana and the nearest international airport is located in Chandigarh also Sri Guru Ram Dass Jee International Airport is the second nearest airport which is 169 kilometres (105 mi) away in Amritsar.

== See also ==
- List of villages in India
