= Jullah Majra =

- Village
- Location in Punjab, India Jullah Majra (India)
- Coordinates: 31.0280813°N 76.0241704°E
- Country: India
- State: Punjab
- District: Shaheed Bhagat Singh Nagar

Government
  - Type: Panchayat raj
  - Body: Gram panchayat
- Elevation: 254 m (833 ft)

Population (2011)
  - Total: 958
- Sex ratio 480/478 ♂/♀

Languages
  - Official: Punjabi
- Time zone: UTC+5:30 (IST)
- PIN: 144518
- Telephone code: 01823
- ISO 3166 code: IN-PB
- Post office: Garcha
- Website: nawanshahr.nic.in

Jullah Majra is a village in Shaheed Bhagat Singh Nagar district of Punjab State, India. It is located 16.7 kilometres (10.4 mi) away from postal head office Garcha, 18 kilometres (11 mi) from Nawanshahr, 9.2 kilometres (5.7 mi) from district headquarter Shaheed Bhagat Singh Nagar and 99 kilometres (62 mi) from state capital Chandigarh. The village is administrated by Sarpanch an elected representative of the village.

== Demography ==
As of 2011, Jullah Majra has a total number of 180 houses and population of 858 of which 480 include are males while 478 are females according to the report published by Census India in 2011. The literacy rate of Jullah Majra is 84.44%, higher than the state average of 75.84%. The population of children under the age of 6 years is 97 which is 10.13% of total population of Jullah Majra, and child sex ratio is approximately 980 as compared to Punjab state average of 846.

Most of the people are from Schedule Caste which constitutes 59.08% of total population in Jullah Majra. The town does not have any Schedule Tribe population so far.

As per the report published by Census India in 2011, 393 people were engaged in work activities out of the total population of Jullah Majra which includes 279 males and 114 females. According to census survey report 2011, 64.63% workers describe their work as main work and 35.37% workers are involved in Marginal activity providing livelihood for less than 6 months.

== Education ==
KC Engineering College and Doaba Khalsa Trust Group Of Institutions are the nearest colleges. Industrial Training Institute for women (ITI Nawanshahr) is 24 kilometres (15 mi). The village is 75 kilometres (47 mi) away from Chandigarh University, 58 kilometres (36 mi) from Indian Institute of Technology and 53 kilometres (33 mi) away from Lovely Professional University.

List of schools nearby:

- K.C. Public School, Nawanshahr
- GSSS Haila, Haila
- Baba Karam Singh Public School, Daulatpur
- U.K. Model High School, Langroya

== Transport ==
Banga railway station is the nearest train station however, Phagwara Junction railway station is 29.5 kilometres (18.3 mi) away from the village. Sahnewal Airport is the nearest domestic airport which located 57 kilometres (35 mi) away in Ludhiana and the nearest international airport is located in Chandigarh also Sri Guru Ram Dass Jee International Airport is the second nearest airport which is 161 kilometres (100 mi) away in Amritsar.

== See also ==
- List of villages in India
