= Mahadipur Kalan =

- Village
- Location in Punjab, India Mahadipur Kalan (India)
- Coordinates: 31.0159149°N 76.1870975°E
- Country: India
- State: Punjab
- District: Shaheed Bhagat Singh Nagar

Government
  - Type: Panchayat raj
  - Body: Gram panchayat
- Elevation: 355 m (1,165 ft)

Population (2011)
  - Total: 154
- Sex ratio 85/69 ♂/♀

Languages
  - Official: Punjabi
- Time zone: UTC+5:30 (IST)
- PIN: 144515
- Telephone code: 01823
- ISO 3166 code: IN-PB
- Post office: Jadla (S.O)
- Website: nawanshahr.nic.in

Mahadipur Kalan is a village in Shaheed Bhagat Singh Nagar district of Punjab State, India. It is located 10 kilometres (6.2 mi) away from sub post office Jadla, 18 kilometres (11 mi) from Nawanshahr, 20 kilometres (12 mi) from district headquarter Shaheed Bhagat Singh Nagar and 89 kilometres (55 mi) from state capital Chandigarh. The village is administrated by Sarpanch an elected representative of the village.

== Demography ==
As of 2011, Mahadipur Kalan has a total number of 34 houses and population of 154 of which 85 include are males while 69 are females according to the report published by Census India in 2011. The literacy rate of Mahadipur Kalan is 82.44%, higher than the state average of 75.84%. The population of children under the age of 6 years is 23 which is 14.94% of total population of Mahadipur Kalan, and child sex ratio is approximately 533 as compared to Punjab state average of 846.

Most of the people are from Schedule Caste which constitutes 94.81% of total population in Mahadipur Kalan. The town does not have any Schedule Tribe population so far.

As per the report published by Census India in 2011, 42 people were engaged in work activities out of the total population of Mahadipur Kalan which includes 41 males and 1 females. According to census survey report 2011, 95.24% workers describe their work as main work and 4.76% workers are involved in Marginal activity providing livelihood for less than 6 months.

== Education ==
KC Engineering College and Doaba Khalsa Trust Group Of Institutions are the nearest colleges. Industrial Training Institute for women (ITI Nawanshahr) is 16 kilometres (9.9 mi). The village is 66 kilometres (41 mi) away from Chandigarh University, 48 kilometres (30 mi) from Indian Institute of Technology and 62 kilometres (39 mi) away from Lovely Professional University.

List of schools nearby:

- Dashmesh Model School, Kahma
- Govt Primary School, Kahlon
- Govt High School, Garcha

== Transport ==
Nawanshahr train station is the nearest train station however, Garhshankar Junction railway station is 30 kilometres (19 mi) away from the village. Sahnewal Airport is the nearest domestic airport which located 47 kilometres (29 mi) away in Ludhiana and the nearest international airport is located in Chandigarh also Sri Guru Ram Dass Jee International Airport is the second nearest airport which is 170 kilometres (110 mi) away in Amritsar.

== See also ==
- List of villages in India
