= Niamatpur =

- Village
- Location in Punjab, India Niamatpur (India)
- Coordinates: 31.0086188°N 76.1220403°E
- Country: India
- State: Punjab
- District: Shaheed Bhagat Singh Nagar

Government
  - Type: Panchayat raj
  - Body: Gram panchayat
- Elevation: 355 m (1,165 ft)

Population (2011)
  - Total: 396
- Sex ratio 211/185 ♂/♀

Languages
  - Official: Punjabi
- Time zone: UTC+5:30 (IST)
- PIN: 144517
- Telephone code: 01823
- ISO 3166 code: IN-PB
- Post office: Rahon (S.O)
- Website: nawanshahr.nic.in

Niamatpur is a village in the Shaheed Bhagat Singh Nagar district of Punjab State, India. It is 4.3 kilometres (2.7 mi) from sub post office Rahon, 14 kilometres (8.7 mi) from Nawanshahr, 15 kilometres (9.3 mi) from district headquarter Shaheed Bhagat Singh Nagar and 84.8 kilometres (52.7 mi) from state capital Chandigarh. The village is administrated by Sarpanch an elected representative of the village.

== Demography ==
As of 2011, Niamatpur has a total number of 84 houses and population of 396 of which 211 include are males while 185 are females according to the report published by Census India in 2011. The literacy rate of Niamatpur is 89.92% higher than the state average of 75.84%. The population of children under the age of 6 years is 29 which is 7.32% of total population of Niamatpur, and child sex ratio is approximately 381 as compared to Punjab state average of 846.

Most of the people are from Schedule Caste which constitutes 57.32% of total population in Niamatpur. The town does not have any Schedule Tribe population so far.

As per the report published by Census India in 2011, 120 people were engaged in work activities out of the total population of Niamatpur which includes 117 males and 3 females. According to census survey report 2011, 99.17% workers describe their work as main work and 0.83% workers are involved in Marginal activity providing livelihood for less than 6 months.

== Education ==
KC Engineering College and Doaba Khalsa Trust Group Of Institutions are the nearest colleges. Industrial Training Institute for women (ITI Nawanshahr) is 15 kilometres (9.3 mi). The village is 60 kilometres (37 mi) away from Chandigarh University, 56 kilometres (35 mi) from Indian Institute of Technology and 57 kilometres (35 mi) away from Lovely Professional University.

List of schools nearby:

- Dashmesh Model School, Kahma
- Govt Primary School, Kahlon
- Govt High School, Garcha

== Transport ==
Nawanshahr train station is the nearest train station however, Garhshankar Junction railway station is 25 kilometres (16 mi) away from the village. Sahnewal Airport is the nearest domestic airport which located 42 kilometres (26 mi) away in Ludhiana and the nearest international airport is located in Chandigarh also Sri Guru Ram Dass Jee International Airport is the second nearest airport which is 167 kilometres (104 mi) away in Amritsar.

== See also ==
- List of villages in India
