= Jhungian, SBS Nagar =

Jhungian
- Village
- Location in Punjab, India Jhungian (India)
- Coordinates: 31.0539959°N 76.2597041°E
- Country: India
- State: Punjab
- District: Shaheed Bhagat Singh Nagar

Government
  - Type: Panchayat raj
  - Body: Gram panchayat
- Elevation: 263 m (863 ft)

Population (2011)
  - Total: 16
- Sex ratio 8/8 ♂/♀

Languages
  - Official: Punjabi
- Time zone: UTC+5:30 (IST)
- PIN: 144518
- Telephone code: 01885
- ISO 3166 code: IN-PB
- Post office: Kharkowal
- Website: nawanshahr.nic.in

Jhungian is a village in Shaheed Bhagat Singh Nagar district, Punjab, India. It is located 3.4 kilometres (2.1 mi) away from postal head office Balachaur, 26 kilometres (16 mi) from Nawanshahr, 34.6 kilometres (21.5 mi) from district headquarter Shaheed Bhagat Singh Nagar and 74 kilometres (46 mi) from state capital Chandigarh. The village is administrated by Sarpanch, an elected representative of the village.

== Demography ==
As of 2011, Jhungian has a total number of five houses, and a population of 16 (eight women and eight men), according to the report published by Census India in 2011. The literacy rate of Jhungian is 76.92%, higher than the state average of 75.84%. The population of children under the age of six years is three, which is 18.75% of the total population of Jhungian, and the child sex ratio is approximately 0 as compared to the Punjab state average of 846.

As per the report published by Census India in 2011, five people were engaged in work activities out of the total population of Jhungian which includes five males and zero females. According to census survey report 2011, 100% workers describe their work as main work and 0% workers are involved in marginal activity providing livelihood for less than six months.

== Education ==
KC Engineering College and Doaba Khalsa Trust Group Of Institutions are the nearest colleges. Industrial Training Institute for women (ITI Nawanshahr) is 24 kilometres (15 mi). The village is 58 kilometres (36 mi) away from Chandigarh University, 34 kilometres (21 mi) from Indian Institute of Technology and 70 kilometres (43 mi) away from Lovely Professional University.

List of schools nearby:

- K.C. Public School, Nawanshahr
- Gsss Haila, Haila
- Baba Karam Singh Public School, Daulatpur
- U.K. Model High School, Langroya

== Transport ==
Nawanshahr railway station is the nearest train station however, Garhshankar Junction railway station is 32 kilometres (20 mi) away from the village. Sahnewal Airport is the nearest domestic airport which located 73 kilometres (45 mi) away in Ludhiana and the nearest international airport is located in Chandigarh also Sri Guru Ram Dass Jee International Airport is the second nearest airport which is 178 kilometres (111 mi) away in Amritsar.

== See also ==
- List of villages in India
