= Mallo Mazara =

- Village
- Location in Punjab, India Mallo Mazara (India)
- Coordinates: 31.0849929°N 75.9552061°E
- Country: India
- State: Punjab
- District: Shaheed Bhagat Singh Nagar

Government
  - Type: Panchayat raj
  - Body: Gram panchayat
- Elevation: 254 m (833 ft)

Population (2011)
  - Total: 714
- Sex ratio 352/362 ♂/♀

Languages
  - Official: Punjabi
- Time zone: UTC+5:30 (IST)
- Telephone code: 01823
- ISO 3166 code: IN-PB
- Website: nawanshahr.nic.in

Mallo Mazara is a village in Shaheed Bhagat Singh Nagar district of Punjab State, India. It is located 13 kilometres (8.1 mi) away from sub post office Banga, 19.7 kilometres (12.2 mi) from Nawanshahr, 10 kilometres (6.2 mi) from district headquarter Shaheed Bhagat Singh Nagar and 110 kilometres (68 mi) from state capital Chandigarh. The village is administrated by Sarpanch an elected representative of the village.

== Demography ==
As of 2011, Mallo Mazara has a total number of 166 houses and population of 714 of which 352 include are males while 362 are females according to the report published by Census India in 2011. The literacy rate of Mallo Mazara is 75.78%, lower than the state average of 75.84%. The population of children under the age of 6 years is 70 which is 9.80% of total population of Mallo Mazara, and child sex ratio is approximately 1000 as compared to Punjab state average of 846.

Most of the people are from Schedule Caste which constitutes 18.77% of total population in Mallo Mazara. The town does not have any Schedule Tribe population so far.

As per the report published by Census India in 2011, 224 people were engaged in work activities out of the total population of Mallo Mazara which includes 206 males and 18 females. According to census survey report 2011, 95.98% workers describe their work as main work and 4.02% workers are involved in Marginal activity providing livelihood for less than 6 months.

== Education ==
KC Engineering College and Doaba Khalsa Trust Group Of Institutions are the nearest colleges. Industrial Training Institute for women (ITI Nawanshahr) is 22 kilometres (14 mi). The village is 86 kilometres (53 mi) away from Chandigarh University, 68.5 kilometres (42.6 mi) from Indian Institute of Technology and 35 kilometres (22 mi) away from Lovely Professional University.

List of schools nearby:

- Dashmesh Model School, Kahma
- Govt Primary School, Kahlon
- Govt High School, Garcha

== Transport ==
Nawanshahr train station is the nearest train station however, Garhshankar Junction railway station is 30 kilometres (19 mi) away from the village. Sahnewal Airport is the nearest domestic airport which located 50 kilometres (31 mi) away in Ludhiana and the nearest international airport is located in Chandigarh also Sri Guru Ram Dass Jee International Airport is the second nearest airport which is 143 kilometres (89 mi) away in Amritsar.

== See also ==
- List of villages in India
