= Ratnana =

- Village
- Location in Punjab, India Ratnana (India)
- Coordinates: 31.0018639°N 76.0789604°E
- Country: India
- State: Punjab
- District: Shaheed Bhagat Singh Nagar

Government
  - Type: Panchayat raj
  - Body: Gram panchayat
- Elevation: 254 m (833 ft)

Population (2011)
  - Total: 427
- Sex ratio 223/204 ♂/♀

Languages
  - Official: Punjabi
- Time zone: UTC+5:30 (IST)
- PIN: 144517
- Telephone code: 01823
- ISO 3166 code: IN-PB
- Post office: Kahlon (S.O)
- Website: nawanshahr.nic.in

Ratnana is a village in Shaheed Bhagat Singh Nagar district of Punjab State, India. It is located 9 kilometres (5.6 mi) away from sub post office Kahlon, 15 kilometres (9.3 mi) from Nawanshahr, 15.8 kilometres (9.8 mi) from district headquarter Shaheed Bhagat Singh Nagar and 89 kilometres (55 mi) from state capital Chandigarh. The village is administrated by Sarpanch an elected representative of the village.

== Demography ==
As of 2011, Ratnana has a total number of 88 houses and population of 427 of which 223 include are males while 204 are females according to the report published by Census India in 2011. The literacy rate of Ratnana is 76.35% higher than the state average of 75.84%. The population of children under the age of 6 years is 38 which is 8.90% of total population of Ratnana, and child sex ratio is approximately 883 as compared to Punjab state average of 846.

Most of the people are from Schedule Caste which constitutes 45.67% of total population in Ratnana. The town does not have any Schedule Tribe population so far.

As per the report published by Census India in 2011, 110 people were engaged in work activities out of the total population of Ratnana which includes 103 males and 7 females. According to census survey report 2011, 90% workers describe their work as main work and 10% workers are involved in Marginal activity providing livelihood for less than 6 months.

== Education ==
The village has a Punjabi medium, co-ed primary school established in 1980. The school provide mid-day meal per Indian Midday Meal Scheme. As per Right of Children to Free and Compulsory Education Act the school provide free education to children between the ages of 6 and 14.

KC Engineering College and Doaba Khalsa Trust Group Of Institutions are the nearest colleges. Industrial Training Institute for women (ITI Nawanshahr) is 16 kilometres (9.9 mi). The village is 65 kilometres (40 mi) away from Chandigarh University, 55 kilometres (34 mi) from Indian Institute of Technology and 58 kilometres (36 mi) away from Lovely Professional University.

== Transport ==
Banga train station is the nearest train station however, Garhshankar Junction railway station is 26 kilometres (16 mi) away from the village. Sahnewal Airport is the nearest domestic airport which located 47 kilometres (29 mi) away in Ludhiana and the nearest international airport is located in Chandigarh also Sri Guru Ram Dass Jee International Airport is the second nearest airport which is 167 kilometres (104 mi) away in Amritsar.

== See also ==
- List of villages in India
