= Mirzapur, SBS Nagar =

Mirzapur
- Village
- Location in Punjab, India Mirzapur (India)
- Coordinates: 31.0088388°N 76.0683954°E
- Country: India
- State: Punjab
- District: Shaheed Bhagat Singh Nagar

Government
  - Type: Panchayat raj
  - Body: Gram panchayat
- Elevation: 254 m (833 ft)

Population (2011)
  - Total: 201
- Sex ratio 107/94 ♂/♀

Languages
  - Official: Punjabi
- Time zone: UTC+5:30 (IST)
- PIN: 144517
- Telephone code: 01823
- ISO 3166 code: IN-PB
- Post office: Kahlon (B.O)
- Website: nawanshahr.nic.in

Mirzapur is a village in the Shaheed Bhagat Singh Nagar district of Punjab State, India. It is located 3.3 kilometres (2.1 mi) from branch post office Kahlon, 15 kilometres (9.3 mi) from Nawanshahr, 16 kilometres (9.9 mi) from district headquarters Shaheed Bhagat Singh Nagar and 96 kilometres (60 mi) from state capital Chandigarh. The village is administrated by Sarpanch, an elected representative of the village.

== Demography ==
As of 2011, Mirzapur had a total of 41 houses and population of 201, of which 107 were males while 94 were females, according to the report published by Census India in 2011. The literacy rate of Mirzapur is 60.23% lower than the state average of 75.84%. The population of children under the age of 6 years is 25, which is 12.44% of total population of Mirzapur, and child sex ratio is approximately 786, compared to the Punjab state average of 846.

Most of the people are from Schedule Caste, which constitutes 34.33% of total population in Mirzapur. The town does not have any Schedule Tribe population so far.

As per the report published by Census India in 2011, 72 people were engaged in work activities out of the total population of Mirzapur, which includes 67 males and 5 females. According to census survey report 2011, 97.22% workers describe their work as main work and 2.78% workers are involved in marginal activity providing livelihood for less than 6 months.

== Education ==
KC Engineering College and Doaba Khalsa Trust Group Of Institutions are the nearest colleges. Industrial Training Institute for women (ITI Nawanshahr) is 16 kilometres (9.9 mi). The village is 75 kilometres (47 mi) away from Chandigarh University, 56 kilometres (35 mi) from Indian Institute of Technology and 60 kilometres (37 mi) away from Lovely Professional University.

List of schools nearby:

- Dashmesh Model School, Kahma
- Govt Primary School, Kahlon
- Govt High School, Garcha

== Transport ==
Nawanshahr train station is the nearest train station, however, Garhshankar Junction railway station is 26 kilometres (16 mi) from the village. Sahnewal Airport is the nearest domestic airport, located 53.8 kilometres (33.4 mi) away in Ludhiana and the nearest international airport is located in Chandigarh; also Sri Guru Ram Dass Jee International Airport is the second nearest airport, which is 168 kilometres (104 mi) away in Amritsar.

== See also ==
- List of villages in India
