= Mahal Khurd =

- Village
- Location in Punjab, India Mahal Khurd (India)
- Coordinates: 31.0741825°N 76.0210294°E
- Country: India
- State: Punjab
- District: Shaheed Bhagat Singh Nagar

Government
  - Type: Panchayat raj
  - Body: Gram panchayat
- Elevation: 254 m (833 ft)

Population (2011)
  - Total: 1,275
- Sex ratio 632/643 ♂/♀

Languages
  - Official: Punjabi
- Time zone: UTC+5:30 (IST)
- PIN: 144518
- Telephone code: 01823
- ISO 3166 code: IN-PB
- Post office: Garcha (S.O)
- Website: nawanshahr.nic.in

Mahal Khurd is a village in Shaheed Bhagat Singh Nagar district of Punjab State, India. It is located 1.9 kilometres (1.2 mi) away from sub post office Garcha, 11.9 kilometres (7.4 mi) from Nawanshahr, 3.6 kilometres (2.2 mi) from district headquarter Shaheed Bhagat Singh Nagar and 97.4 kilometres (60.5 mi) from state capital Chandigarh. The village is administrated by Sarpanch an elected representative of the village.

== Demography ==
As of 2011, Mahal Khurd has a total number of 261 houses and population of 1275 of which 632 include are males while 643 are females according to the report published by Census India in 2011. The literacy rate of Mahal Khurd is 80.36%, higher than the state average of 75.84%. The population of children under the age of 6 years is 119 which is 9.33% of total population of Mahal Khurd, and child sex ratio is approximately 1380 as compared to Punjab state average of 846.

Most of the people are from Schedule Caste which constitutes 48.08% of total population in Mahal Khurd. The town does not have any Schedule Tribe population so far.

As per the report published by Census India in 2011, 362 people were engaged in work activities out of the total population of Mahal Khurd which includes 344 males and 18 females. According to census survey report 2011, 97.51% workers describe their work as main work and 2.49% workers are involved in Marginal activity providing livelihood for less than 6 months.

== Education ==
KC Engineering College and Doaba Khalsa Trust Group Of Institutions are the nearest colleges. Industrial Training Institute for women (ITI Nawanshahr) is 14.3 kilometres (8.9 mi). The village is 75.5 kilometres (46.9 mi) away from Chandigarh University, 57.5 kilometres (35.7 mi) from Indian Institute of Technology and 46.3 kilometres (28.8 mi) away from Lovely Professional University.

List of schools nearby:

- Dashmesh Model School, Kahma
- Govt Primary School, Kahlon
- Govt High School, Garcha

== Transport ==
Nawanshahr railway station is the nearest train station, However, Garhshankar Junction train station is 24.7 kilometres (15.3 mi) away from the village. Sahnewal Airport is the nearest domestic airport located 57 kilometres (35 mi) away in Ludhiana and the nearest international airport is located in Chandigarh also Sri Guru Ram Dass Jee International Airport is the second nearest airport which is 154 kilometres (96 mi) away in Amritsar.

== See also ==
- List of villages in India
