= Kharkuwal =

- Village
- Location in Punjab, India Kharkuwal (India)
- Coordinates: 31.0243631°N 76.0182827°E
- Country: India
- State: Punjab
- District: Shaheed Bhagat Singh Nagar

Government
  - Type: Panchayat raj
  - Body: Gram panchayat
- Elevation: 254 m (833 ft)

Population (2011)
  - Total: 663
- Sex ratio 344/319 ♂/♀

Languages
  - Official: Punjabi
- Time zone: UTC+5:30 (IST)
- PIN: 144518
- Telephone code: 01884
- ISO 3166 code: IN-PB
- Post office: Garcha
- Website: nawanshahr.nic.in

Kharkuwal is a village in Shaheed Bhagat Singh Nagar district of Punjab State, India. It is located 17 kilometres (11 mi) away from postal head office Garcha, 18 kilometres (11 mi) from Nawanshahr, 10 kilometres (6.2 mi) from district headquarter Shaheed Bhagat Singh Nagar and 99 kilometres (62 mi) from state capital Chandigarh. The village is administrated by Sarpanch an elected representative of the village. Mr. Ramji Dass Kharkuwal, was the Sarpanch of the village and also held the position of Numberdar. He contributed significantly to social welfare and development in the area. For instance, he initiated the construction of a large wastewater management pond and advocated for improved road connectivity, linking the village directly to the main road that connects to Ludhiana, thereby easing accessibility.

== Demography ==
As of 2011, Kharkuwal has a total number of 135 houses and population of 663 of which 344 include are males while 319 are females according to the report published by Census India in 2011. The literacy rate of Kharkuwal is 75.49% lower than the state average of 75.84%. The population of children under the age of 6 years is 55 which is 8.30% of total population of Kharkuwal, and child sex ratio is approximately 897 as compared to Punjab state average of 846.

Most of the people are from Schedule Caste which constitutes 99.85% of total population in Kharkuwal. The town does not have any Schedule Tribe population so far.

As per the report published by Census India in 2011, 214 people were engaged in work activities out of the total population of Kharkuwal which includes 174 males and 40 females. According to census survey report 2011, 52.34% workers describe their work as main work and 47.66% workers are involved in Marginal activity providing livelihood for less than 6 months.

== Education ==
The village has a Punjabi medium, co-ed primary school established in 1951. The school provide mid-day meal as per Indian Midday Meal Scheme. As per Right of Children to Free and Compulsory Education Act the school provide free education to children between the ages of 6 and 14.

Amardeep Singh Shergill Memorial college Mukandpur and Sikh National College Banga are the nearest colleges. Industrial Training Institute for women (ITI Nawanshahr) is 20 kilometres (12 mi) The village is 58 kilometres (36 mi) from Indian Institute of Technology and 53 kilometres (33 mi) away from Lovely Professional University.

== Transport ==
Nawanshahr railway station is the nearest train station however, Phagwara Junction railway station is 30 kilometres (19 mi) away from the village. Sahnewal Airport is the nearest domestic airport which located 57 kilometres (35 mi) away in Ludhiana and the nearest international airport is located in Chandigarh also Sri Guru Ram Dass Jee International Airport is the second nearest airport which is 161 kilometres (100 mi) away in Amritsar.

== See also ==
- List of villages in India
