= Alowal, Nawanshahr =

Alowal
- Village
- Location in Punjab, India Alowal (India)
- Coordinates: 31.0293097°N 76.2060152°E
- Country: India
- State: Punjab
- District: Shaheed Bhagat Singh Nagar

Government
  - Type: Panchayat raj
  - Body: Gram panchayat
- Elevation: 254 m (833 ft)

Population (2011)
  - Total: 217
- Sex ratio 119/98 ♂/♀

Languages
  - Official: Punjabi
- Time zone: UTC+5:30 (IST)
- PIN: 144532
- Telephone code: 01824
- ISO 3166 code: IN-PB
- Post office: Samundra
- Website: nawanshahr.nic.in

Alowal or Allowal is a village in Shaheed Bhagat Singh Nagar district of Punjab State, India. It is located 17 kilometres (11 mi) away from postal head office Samundra, 15 kilometres (9.3 mi) from Balachaur, 17 kilometres (11 mi) from district headquarter Shaheed Bhagat Singh Nagar and 85.6 kilometres (53.2 mi) from state capital Chandigarh. The village is administered by Sarpanch an elected representative of the village.

== Demography ==
As of 2011, Alowal has a total number of 43 houses and a population of 217 of which 119 include are males while 98 are females according to the report published by Census India in 2011. The literacy rate of Alowal is 72.92%, lower than the state average of 75.84%. The population of children under the age of 6 years is 25 which is 11.52% of total population of Alowal, and child sex ratio is approximately 667 as compared to Punjab state average of 846.

Most of the people are from Schedule Caste which constitutes 92.17% of total population in Alowal. The town does not have any Schedule Tribe population so far.

As per the report published by Census India in 2011, 95 people were engaged in work activities out of the total population of Alowal which includes 67 males and 28 females. According to census survey report 2011, 14.74% workers describe their work as main work and 85.26% workers are involved in Marginal activity providing livelihood for less than 6 months.

== Education ==
The village has a Punjabi medium, co-ed upper primary school founded in 1960. The schools provide mid-day meal which prepared in School premises as per Indian Midday Meal Scheme. The school provide free education to children between the ages of 6 and 14 as per Right of Children to Free and Compulsory Education Act. Amardeep Singh Shergill Memorial college Mukandpur and Sikh National College Banga, KC Engineering College and Doaba Khalsa Trust Group Of Institutions are the nearest colleges. Industrial Training Institute for women (ITI Nawanshahr) is 14 kilometres (8.7 mi) away from the village.

== Transport ==
Nawanshahr railway station is the nearest train station however, Garhshankar Junction railway station is 26.7 kilometres (16.6 mi) away from the village. Sahnewal Airport is the nearest domestic airport which located 60 kilometres (37 mi) away in Ludhiana and the nearest international airport is located in Chandigarh also Sri Guru Ram Dass Jee International Airport is the second nearest airport which is 169 kilometres (105 mi) away in Amritsar.

== See also ==
- List of villages in India
