= Mahalon, SBS Nagar =

Mahalon
- Village
- Location in Punjab, India Mahalon (India)
- Coordinates: 31.1445856°N 76.097767°E
- Country: India
- State: Punjab
- District: Shaheed Bhagat Singh Nagar

Government
  - Type: Panchayat raj
  - Body: Gram panchayat
- Elevation: 355 m (1,165 ft)

Population (2011)
  - Total: 1,862
- Sex ratio 992/870 ♂/♀

Languages
  - Official: Punjabi
- Time zone: UTC+5:30 (IST)
- PIN: 144514
- Telephone code: 01823
- ISO 3166 code: IN-PB
- Post office: Nawanshahr
- Website: nawanshahr.nic.in

Mahalon is a village in Shaheed Bhagat Singh Nagar district of Punjab State, India. It is located 3.7 kilometres (2.3 mi) away from postal head office Nawanshahr, 11.9 kilometres (7.4 mi) from Banga, 3.2 kilometres (2.0 mi) from district headquarter Shaheed Bhagat Singh Nagar and 91.2 kilometres (56.7 mi) from state capital Chandigarh. The village is administrated by Sarpanch an elected representative of the village.

== Demography ==
As of 2011, Mahalon has a total number of 371 houses and population of 1862 of which 992 include are males while 870 are females according to the report published by Census India in 2011. The literacy rate of Mahalon is 78.05%, higher than the state average of 75.84%. The population of children under the age of 6 years is 190 which is 10.20% of total population of Mahalon, and child sex ratio is approximately 759 as compared to Punjab state average of 846.

Most of the people are from Schedule Caste which constitutes 78.20% of total population in Mahalon. The town does not have any Schedule Tribe population so far.

As per the report published by Census India in 2011, 581 people were engaged in work activities out of the total population of Mahalon which includes 518 males and 63 females. According to census survey report 2011, 97.59% workers describe their work as main work and 2.41% workers are involved in Marginal activity providing livelihood for less than 6 months.

== Education ==
The village has a Punjabi medium, co-ed primary school established in 1945 and an upper primary school established in 1987. The schools provide mid-day meal as per Indian Midday Meal Scheme. As per Right of Children to Free and Compulsory Education Act the school provide free education to children between the ages of 6 and 14.

Sikh National College Banga, KC Engineering College and Doaba Khalsa Trust Group Of Institutions are the nearest colleges. Industrial Training Institute for women (ITI Nawanshahr) is 4.3 kilometres (2.7 mi). The village is 74.6 kilometres (46.4 mi) away from Chandigarh University, 51 kilometres (32 mi) from Indian Institute of Technology and 43 kilometres (27 mi) away from Lovely Professional University.

== Transport ==
Nawanshahr railway station is the nearest train station, However, Garhshankar Junction train station is 11 kilometres (6.8 mi) away from the village. Sahnewal Airport is the nearest domestic airport located 59 kilometres (37 mi) away in Ludhiana and the nearest international airport is located in Chandigarh also Sri Guru Ram Dass Jee International Airport is the second nearest airport which is 151 kilometres (94 mi) away in Amritsar.

== See also ==
- List of villages in India
