= Birowal =

- Village
- Location in Punjab, India Birowal (India)
- Coordinates: 31.0797824°N 76.2335031°E
- Country: India
- State: Punjab
- District: Shaheed Bhagat Singh Nagar

Government
  - Type: Panchayat raj
  - Body: Gram panchayat
- Elevation: 254 m (833 ft)

Population (2011)
  - Total: 926
- Sex ratio 468/458 ♂/♀

Languages
  - Official: Punjabi
- Time zone: UTC+5:30 (IST)
- PIN: 144515
- Telephone code: 01823
- ISO 3166 code: IN-PB
- Post office: Jadla
- Website: nawanshahr.nic.in

Birowal is a village in Shaheed Bhagat Singh Nagar district of Punjab State, India. It is located 14 kilometres (8.7 mi) away from Rahon, 8 kilometres (5.0 mi) from Balachaur, 14 kilometres (8.7 mi) from district headquarter Shaheed Bhagat Singh Nagar and 78 kilometres (48 mi) from state capital Chandigarh. The village is administrated by Sarpanch an elected representative of the village.

== Demography ==
As of 2011, Birowal has a total number of 192 houses and population of 926 of which 468 include are males while 458 are females according to the report published by Census India in 2011. The literacy rate of Birowal is 78.25%, higher than the state average of 75.84%. The population of children under the age of 6 years is 80 which is 8.64% of total population of Birowal, and child sex ratio is approximately 1000 as compared to Punjab state average of 846.

Most of the people are from Schedule Caste which constitutes 41.90% of total population in Birowal. The town does not have any Schedule Tribe population so far.

As per the report published by Census India in 2011, 420 people were engaged in work activities out of the total population of Birowal which includes 275 males and 145 females. According to census survey report 2011, 52.62% workers describe their work as main work and 47.38% workers are involved in Marginal activity providing livelihood for less than 6 months.

== Education ==
The village has a Punjabi medium, co-ed upper primary school founded in 1976. The schools provide mid-day meal as per Indian Midday Meal Scheme and the meal prepared in school premises. As per Right of Children to Free and Compulsory Education Act the school provide free education to children between the ages of 6 and 14.

KC Engineering College and Doaba Khalsa Trust Group Of Institutions are the nearest colleges. Industrial Training Institute for women (ITI Nawanshahr) is 5 kilometres (3.1 mi) away from the village. Lovely Professional University is 57 kilometres (35 mi) away from the village.

== Transport ==
Nawanshahr railway station is the nearest train station however, Garshankar Junction railway station is 26 kilometres (16 mi) away from the village. Sahnewal Airport is the nearest domestic airport which located 60 kilometres (37 mi) away in Ludhiana and the nearest international airport is located in Chandigarh also Sri Guru Ram Dass Jee International Airport is the second nearest airport which is 166 kilometres (103 mi) away in Amritsar.

== See also ==
- List of villages in India
