= Chahar Mazara =

- Village
- Location in Punjab, India Chahar Mazara (India)
- Coordinates: 31.041444°N 76.1841881°E
- Country: India
- State: Punjab
- District: Shaheed Bhagat Singh Nagar

Government
  - Type: Panchayat raj
  - Body: Gram panchayat
- Elevation: 254 m (833 ft)

Population (2011)
  - Total: 654
- Sex ratio 322/332 ♂/♀

Languages
  - Official: Punjabi
- Time zone: UTC+5:30 (IST)
- PIN: 144513
- Telephone code: 01823
- ISO 3166 code: IN-PB
- Post office: Nawanshahr
- Website: nawanshahr.nic.in

Chahar Mazara is a village in Shaheed Bhagat Singh Nagar district of Punjab State, India. It is located 15 kilometres (9.3 mi) away from postal head office Nawanshahr, 10 kilometres (6.2 mi) from Banga, 29 kilometres (18 mi) from district headquarter Shaheed Bhagat Singh Nagar and 87 kilometres (54 mi) from state capital Chandigarh. The village is administrated by Sarpanch an elected representative of the village.

== Demography ==
As of 2011, Chahar Mazara has a total number of 103 houses and population of 552 of which 270 include are males while 282 are females according to the report published by Census India in 2011. The literacy rate of Chahar Mazara is 74.90%, lower than the state average of 75.84%. The population of children under the age of 6 years is 46 which is 8.33% of total population of Chahar Mazara, and child sex ratio is approximately 840 as compared to Punjab state average of 846.

Most of the people are from Schedule Caste which constitutes 35.33% of total population in Chahar Mazara. The town does not have any Schedule Tribe population so far.

As per the report published by Census India in 2011, 202 people were engaged in work activities out of the total population of Chahar Mazara which includes 170 males and 32 females. According to census survey report 2011, 69.31% workers describe their work as main work and 30.69% workers are involved in Marginal activity providing livelihood for less than 6 months.

== Education ==
The village has a Hindi medium, co-ed upper primary with secondary school founded in 1954. The schools provide mid-day meal which prepared in school premises as per Indian Midday Meal Scheme and the meal prepared in school premises. As per Right of Children to Free and Compulsory Education Act the school provide free education to children between the ages of 6 and 14.

KC Engineering College and Doaba Khalsa Trust Group Of Institutions are the nearest colleges. Industrial Training Institute for women (ITI Nawanshahr) is 5 kilometres (3.1 mi) away from the village. Lovely Professional University is 61 kilometres (38 mi) away from the village.

List of schools nearby:

- Rayat Institute Of Engineering & Technology, Railmajra
- Guru Teg Bahadur Model School, Behram
- Sandhu Institute Of Nursing, Mahalon

== Transport ==
Nawanshahr railway station is the nearest train station however, Garhshankar Junction railway station is 27 kilometres (17 mi) away from the village. Sahnewal Airport is the nearest domestic airport which located 48 kilometres (30 mi) away in Ludhiana and the nearest international airport is located in Chandigarh also Sri Guru Ram Dass Jee International Airport is the second nearest airport which is 168 kilometres (104 mi) away in Amritsar.

== See also ==
- List of villages in India
