= Garhi Bharti =

- Village
- Location in Punjab, India Garhi Bharti (India)
- Coordinates: 31.0450934°N 76.0590899°E
- Country: India
- State: Punjab
- District: Shaheed Bhagat Singh Nagar

Government
  - Type: Panchayat raj
  - Body: Gram panchayat
- Elevation: 254 m (833 ft)

Population (2011)
  - Total: 470
- Sex ratio 231/239 ♂/♀

Languages
  - Official: Punjabi
- Time zone: UTC+5:30 (IST)
- PIN: 144518
- Telephone code: 01823
- ISO 3166 code: IN-PB
- Post office: Garcha
- Website: nawanshahr.nic.in

Garhi Bharti is a village in Shaheed Bhagat Singh Nagar district of Punjab State, India. It is located 6.1 kilometres (3.8 mi) away from postal head office Garcha, 14 kilometres (8.7 mi) from Nawanshahr, 8.1 kilometres (5.0 mi) from district headquarter Shaheed Bhagat Singh Nagar and 95 kilometres (59 mi) from state capital Chandigarh. The village is administrated by Sarpanch an elected representative of the village.

== Demography ==
As of 2011, Garhi Bharti has a total number of 87 houses and population of 470 of which 231 include are males while 239 are females according to the report published by Census India in 2011. The literacy rate of Garhi Bharti is 82.44%, higher than the state average of 75.84%. The population of children under the age of 6 years is 43 which is 9.15% of total population of Garhi Bharti, and child sex ratio is approximately 955 as compared to Punjab state average of 846.

Most of the people are from Schedule Caste which constitutes 67.87% of total population in Garhi Bharti. The town does not have any Schedule Tribe population so far.

As per the report published by Census India in 2011, 134 people were engaged in work activities out of the total population of Garhi Bharti which includes 119 males and 15 females. According to census survey report 2011, 91.04% workers describe their work as main work and 8.96% workers are involved in Marginal activity providing livelihood for less than 6 months.

== Education ==
The village has a Punjabi medium, co-ed primary school founded in 1972. The schools does not provide mid-day meal. The school provide free education to children between the ages of 6 and 14 as per Right of Children to Free and Compulsory Education Act. KC Engineering College and Doaba Khalsa Trust Group Of Institutions are the nearest colleges. Industrial Training Institute for women (ITI Nawanshahr) is 15 kilometres (9.3 mi) and Lovely Professional University is 51 kilometres (32 mi) away from the village.

== Transport ==
Nawanshahr railway station is the nearest train station however, Garhshankar Junction railway station is 25 kilometres (16 mi) away from the village. Sahnewal Airport is the nearest domestic airport which located 52 kilometres (32 mi) away in Ludhiana and the nearest international airport is located in Chandigarh also Sri Guru Ram Dass Jee International Airport is the second nearest airport which is 159 kilometres (99 mi) away in Amritsar.

== See also ==
- List of villages in India
