= Dodhala =

- Village
- Location in Punjab, India Dodhala (India)
- Coordinates: 31.0485035°N 76.0453462°E
- Country: India
- State: Punjab
- District: Shaheed Bhagat Singh Nagar

Government
  - Type: Panchayat raj
  - Body: Gram panchayat
- Elevation: 254 m (833 ft)

Population (2011)
  - Total: 870
- Sex ratio 401/469 ♂/♀

Languages
  - Official: Punjabi
- Time zone: UTC+5:30 (IST)
- PIN: 144518
- Telephone code: 01823
- ISO 3166 code: IN-PB
- Post office: Garcha
- Website: nawanshahr.nic.in

Dodhala is a village in Shaheed Bhagat Singh Nagar district of Punjab State, India. It is located 4 kilometres (2.5 mi) away from postal head office Garcha, 12 kilometres (7.5 mi) from Nawanshahr, 6 kilometres (3.7 mi) from district headquarter Shaheed Bhagat Singh Nagar and 99 kilometres (62 mi) from state capital Chandigarh. The village is administrated by Sarpanch Smt . Surinder Kaur W/o Mr Gulzar Singh Saini an elected representative of the village.

== Demography ==
As of 2011, Dodhala has a total number of 199 houses and population of 870 of which 401 include are males while 469 are females according to the report published by Census India in 2011. The literacy rate of Dodhala is 85.77%, higher than the state average of 75.84%. The population of children under the age of 6 years is 62 which is 7.13% of total population of Dodhala, and child sex ratio is approximately 1067 as compared to Punjab state average of 846.

Most of the people are from Schedule Caste which constitutes 30.92% of total population in Dodhala. The town does not have any Schedule Tribe population so far.

As per the report published by Census India in 2011, 243 people were engaged in work activities out of the total population of Dodhala which includes 224 males and 19 females. According to census survey report 2011, 93.83% workers describe their work as main work and 6.12% workers are involved in Marginal activity providing livelihood for less than 6 months.

== Education ==
The village has a Punjabi medium, co-ed primary school founded in 1976. The schools does not provide mid-day meal. The school provide free education to children between the ages of 6 and 14 as per Right of Children to Free and Compulsory Education Act. KC Engineering College and Doaba Khalsa Trust Group Of Institutions are the nearest colleges. Industrial Training Institute for women (ITI Nawanshahr) is 15 kilometres (9.3 mi) and Lovely Professional University is 49 kilometres (30 mi) away from the village.

== Transport ==
Nawanshahr railway station is the nearest train station however, Garhshankar Junction railway station is 28 kilometres (17 mi) away from the village. Sahnewal Airport is the nearest domestic airport which located 56 kilometres (35 mi) away in Ludhiana and the nearest international airport is located in Chandigarh also Sri Guru Ram Dass Jee International Airport is the second nearest airport which is 157 kilometres (98 mi) away in Amritsar.

== See also ==
- List of villages in India
