= Kishanpura, SBS Nagar =

Kishanpura
- Village
- Location in Punjab, India Kishanpura (India)
- Coordinates: 31.1042319°N 76.19128°E
- Country: India
- State: Punjab
- District: Shaheed Bhagat Singh Nagar

Government
  - Type: Panchayat raj
  - Body: Gram panchayat

Population (2011)
  - Total: 1,187
- Sex ratio 588/599 ♂/♀

Languages
  - Official: Punjabi
- Time zone: UTC+5:30 (IST)
- PIN: 144516
- ISO 3166 code: IN-PB
- Post office: Langroya
- Website: nawanshahr.nic.in

Kishanpura is a village in Shaheed Bhagat Singh Nagar district of Punjab State, India. It is located 3.2 kilometres (2.0 mi) away from postal head office Langroya, 9 kilometres (5.6 mi) from Nawanshahr, 17.3 kilometres (10.7 mi) from district headquarter Shaheed Bhagat Singh Nagar and 83 kilometres (52 mi) from state capital Chandigarh. The village is administrated by the Sarpanch, an elected representative of the village.

== Demography ==
As of 2011, Kishanpura has a total number of 269 houses and population of 1187 of which 588 include are males while 599 are females according to the report published by Census India in 2011. The literacy rate of Kishanpura is 80.17%, higher than the state average of 75.84%. The population of children under the age of 6 years is 118 which is 9.94% of total population of Kishanpura, and child sex ratio is approximately 903 as compared to Punjab state average of 846.

Most of the people are from Schedule Caste which constitutes 35.55% of total population in Kishanpura. The town does not have any Schedule Tribe population so far.

As per the report published by Census India in 2011, 316 people were engaged in work activities out of the total population of Kishanpura which includes 303 males and 13 females. According to census survey report 2011, 97.15% workers describe their work as main work and 2.85% workers are involved in Marginal activity providing livelihood for less than 6 months.

== Education ==
The village has a Punjabi medium, co-ed primary school established in 1954. The school provide mid-day meal as per Indian Midday Meal Scheme. As per Right of Children to Free and Compulsory Education Act the school provide free education to children between the ages of 6 and 14.

Amardeep Singh Shergill Memorial college Mukandpur and Sikh National College Banga are the nearest colleges. Industrial Training Institute for women (ITI Nawanshahr) is 6.6 kilometres (4.1 mi) The village is 41 kilometres (25 mi) from Indian Institute of Technology and 54 kilometres (34 mi) away from Lovely Professional University.

== Transport ==
Banga railway station is the nearest train station however, Phagwara Junction railway station is 18 kilometres (11 mi) away from the village. Sahnewal Airport is the nearest domestic airport which located 60 kilometres (37 mi) away in Ludhiana and the nearest international airport is located in Chandigarh also Sri Guru Ram Dass Jee International Airport is the second nearest airport which is 161 kilometres (100 mi) away in Amritsar.

== See also ==
- List of villages in India
