= Durgapur, SBS Nagar =

Durgapur
- Village
- Location in Punjab, India Durgapur (India)
- Coordinates: 31.1340897°N 76.1193412°E
- Country: India
- State: Punjab
- District: Shaheed Bhagat Singh Nagar

Government
  - Type: Panchayat raj
  - Body: Gram panchayat
- Elevation: 255 m (837 ft)

Population (2011)
  - Total: 794
- Sex ratio 407/387 ♂/♀

Languages
  - Official: Punjabi
- Time zone: UTC+5:30 (IST)
- PIN: 144514
- Telephone code: 01823
- ISO 3166 code: IN-PB
- Post office: Nawanshahr
- Website: nawanshahr.nic.in

Durgapur is a village in Shaheed Bhagat Singh Nagar district (NawanShahr) of Punjab State, India. It is located 2.3 kilometres (1.4 mi) away from postal head office Nawanshahr, 10 kilometres (6.2 mi) from Garhshankar, 10.6 kilometres (6.6 mi) from district headquarter Shaheed Bhagat Singh Nagar and 91.6 kilometres (56.9 mi) from state capital Chandigarh. The village is administrated by Sarpanch an elected representative of the village.

== Demography ==
As of 2011, Durgapur has a total number of 163 houses and population of 794 of which 407 include are males while 387 are females according to the report published by Census India in 2011. The literacy rate of Durgapur is 80.44%, higher than the state average of 75.84%. The population of children under the age of 6 years is 68 which is 8.56% of total population of Durgapur, and child sex ratio is approximately 889 as compared to Punjab state average of 846.

Most of the people are from Schedule Caste which constitutes 40.55% of total population in Durgapur. The town does not have any Schedule Tribe population so far.

As per the report published by Census India in 2011, 245 people were engaged in work activities out of the total population of Durgapur which includes 219 males and 26 females. According to census survey report 2011, 92.24% workers describe their work as main work and 7.76% workers are involved in Marginal activity providing livelihood for less than 6 months.

== Historical Places ==
=== Gurudwara Guru Hargobind Sahib ji ===
The Gurudwara is situated at north of the village. This place is visited by 3 Sikh gurus in 1691 Bikrami samvat.

- Guru Hargobind
- Guru Tegh Bahadur
- Guru Har Rai

The Gurus stayed here for one day and one night in a room near a well. The devotees met them at the time.

== Education ==
The village has a Punjabi medium, co-ed primary school founded in 1992. The schools does not provide mid-day meal. The school provide free education to children between the ages of 6 and 14 as per Right of Children to Free and Compulsory Education Act. The village also formerly had an English medium, co-ed private un-aided primary with upper primary school founded in 2004(recently closed). KC Engineering College and Doaba Khalsa Trust Group Of Institutions are the nearest colleges. Industrial Training Institute for women (ITI Nawanshahr) is 2.5 kilometres (1.6 mi) and Lovely Professional University is 45 kilometres (28 mi) away from the village.

== Notable people ==
Bhangra singer-songwriter Jazzy B was born in Durgapur.

== Transport ==
Nawanshahr railway station is the nearest train station however, Garhshankar Junction railway station is 11 kilometres (6.8 mi) away from the village. Sahnewal Airport is the nearest domestic airport which located 57 kilometres (35 mi) away in Ludhiana and the nearest international airport is located in Chandigarh also Sri Guru Ram Dass Jee International Airport is the second nearest airport which is 154 kilometres (96 mi) away in Amritsar.

== See also ==
- List of villages in India
