= Our Children Foundation =

- Formation: October 28, 2008; 18 years ago
- Type: Non-Profit Organisation
- Purpose: A Society under Society’s Registration Act 1961, under West Bengal Act XXVIPurpose/focus - Education/Literacy
- Location: Kolkata
- Region served: West Bengal
- Website: Our Children Foundation

Our Children Foundation (OCF) is a non-profit organisation that provides free education for underprivileged children in India’s rural and semi-rural villages. Founded by Capt. Asraf Ali Shaikh, Founder, Chairman - Our Children Foundation. The goal of Our Children Foundation is to provide institutional reforms that improve disadvantaged people’s access to, success in, and opportunities from quality education in a sustainable manner. Our Children School is OCF’s first project, which focuses on establishing and reopening education centres in areas with inadequate access to schooling in West Bengal.

== History ==
Our Children Foundation was registered as a Society under West Bengal Society Registration Act XXVI, 1961 on 22 October 2008. Its first school opened on 2 May 2009 in rural Andharmanik village, two hours south of Kolkata. On 22 March 2010, two more schools opened in semi-rural slums of Sahara and Shishumala near Kolkata Airport. As of May 2011, over 35 local teachers had been provided employment and 1000 children were receiving education through OCF's Our Children School projects.

== Mission ==
Our Children Foundation’s motto, ‘Empowering lives through Education’, reflects its mission to address issues of poverty, healthcare, population control and unemployment through improvements in access to and quality of education, with a focus on India’s younger generations. In doing so, Our Children School projects focus beyond basic educational services in order to maximise participation in a range of areas and encourage students to explore their own interests and curiosities.

== Services ==
=== Infrastructural support ===
Includes improvements to school buildings, furniture, implementation of computer labs, educational tools and equipment, assurance of safe drinking water facilities, separate gendered toilet facilities.

=== Teachers training ===
Implementing quality teacher training opportunities in order to raise the standing of education provided, increase the motivation and engagement of children in the learning process, and increase the level of satisfaction and expertise of teachers in disadvantaged areas.

=== Midday meals ===
Free lunch meals for children under the government-funded mid-day meal scheme are in the process of being implemented in all three schools. Mid-day meals involve the provision of free lunch to school-children on all working days. It is based on the understanding that children must first be fed nutritionally before being able to grow through educational engagements.

=== Art exchange ===
A cultural exchange programme that exchanges creative art works between classes in India and Australia. The principle of Art Exchange is to increase cross-cultural and global awareness, provide an avenue of personal expression, and enhance student motivation, enjoyment and engagement from schooling.
