= Cholang =

- Village
- Location in Punjab, India Cholang (India)
- Coordinates: 31.2119197°N 75.5009692°E
- Country: India
- State: Punjab
- District: Jalandhar
- Tehsil: Bhogpur

Government
  - Type: Panchayat raj
  - Body: Gram panchayat
- Elevation: 246 m (807 ft)

Population (2011)
  - Total: 435
- Sex ratio 223/212 ♂/♀

Languages
  - Official: Punjabi
- Time zone: UTC+5:30 (IST)
- PIN: 144201
- Telephone: 01886
- ISO 3166 code: IN-PB
- Vehicle registration: PB- 08
- Website: jalandhar.nic.in

Cholang is a village in Jalandhar district of Punjab State, India. It is located 39.7 km away from Phillaur, 16.4 km from district headquarter Jalandhar and 140 km from state capital Chandigarh. The village is administrated by a sarpanch who is an elected representative of village as per Panchayati raj (India).

== Education ==
The village has a Punjabi medium, co-ed primary school (PRI Cholang School). The school provide mid-day meal as per Indian Midday Meal Scheme and the meal prepared in school premises and it was found in 1962.

== Demography ==
As of 2011, Cholang has a total number of 72 houses and population of 435 of which 223 are males while 212 are females according to the report published by Census India in 2011. Literacy rate of Cholang is 70.94%, lower than state average of 86.83%. The population of children under the age of 6 years is 53 which is 12.18% of total population of Cholang, and child sex ratio is approximately 893 higher than state average of 846.

Most of the people are from Schedule Caste which constitutes 61.15% of total population in Cholang. The town does not have any Schedule Tribe population so far.

As per census 2011, 99 people were engaged in work activities out of the total population of Cholang which includes 95 males and 4 females. According to census survey report 2011, 95.96% workers describe their work as main work and 4.04% workers are involved in marginal activity providing livelihood for less than 6 months.

== Transport ==
=== Rail ===
Cholang has a railway station operated by Northern Railway, Ferozpur Division. It is located on Pathankot-Jalandhar Line. 6 passenger trains have a hault here. One can get to Pathankot, Jalandhar and Amritsar by these trains. Tanda Urmar is the nearest station to get direct train to Delhi.

=== Air ===
The nearest domestic airport is located 68 km away in Ludhiana and the nearest international airport is located in Chandigarh also Sri Guru Ram Dass Jee International Airport is the second nearest airport which is 112 km away in Amritsar.
