= Hansron =

Coordinates: 31°05′N 76°05′E

Hansron is a small village located close to Nawanshahr within the Indian state of Punjab. It has a population of 1363 with around 262 households.
