= Daulatpur, SBS Nagar =

Daulatpur
- Village
- Location in Punjab, India Daulatpur (India)
- Coordinates: 31.1036746°N 76.2080812°E
- Country: India
- State: Punjab
- District: Shaheed Bhagat Singh Nagar

Government
  - Type: Panchayat raj
  - Body: Gram panchayat
- Elevation: 355 m (1,165 ft)

Population (2011)
  - Total: 1,969
- Sex ratio 965/1004 ♂/♀

Languages
  - Official: Punjabi
- Time zone: UTC+5:30 (IST)
- PIN: 144516
- Telephone code: 01823
- ISO 3166 code: IN-PB
- Post office: Langroya
- Website: nawanshahr.nic.in

Daulatpur is a village in Shaheed Bhagat Singh Nagar district of Punjab State, India. It is located 5.5 kilometres (3.4 mi) away from postal head office Langroya, 11 kilometres (6.8 mi) from Nawanshahr, 19 kilometres (12 mi) from district headquarter Shaheed Bhagat Singh Nagar and 82 kilometres (51 mi) from state capital Chandigarh. The village is administrated by Sarpanch an elected representative of the village.

== Demography ==
As of 2011, Daulatpur has a total number of 433 houses and population of 1969 of which 965 include are males while 1004 are females according to the report published by Census India in 2011. The literacy rate of Daulatpur is 83.63%, higher than the state average of 75.84%. The population of children under the age of 6 years is 167 which is 8.48% of total population of Daulatpur, and child sex ratio is approximately 856 as compared to Punjab state average of 846.

Most of the people are from Schedule Caste which constitutes 28.64% of total population in Daulatpur. The town does not have any Schedule Tribe population so far.

As per the report published by Census India in 2011, 621 people were engaged in work activities out of the total population of Daulatpur which includes 524 males and 97 females. According to census survey report 2011, 82.93% workers describe their work as main work and 17.07% workers are involved in Marginal activity providing livelihood for less than 6 months.

== Education ==
The village has a Punjabi medium, co-ed primary school founded in 1950. The schools provide mid-day meal as per Indian Midday Meal Scheme. The school provide free education to children between the ages of 6 and 14 as per Right of Children to Free and Compulsory Education Act.

KC Engineering College and Doaba Khalsa Trust Group Of Institutions are the nearest colleges. Industrial Training Institute for women (ITI Nawanshahr) is 8 kilometres (5.0 mi) and Lovely Professional University is 55 kilometres (34 mi) away from the village.

List of schools nearby:

- K.C. Public School, Nawanshahr
- Gsss Haila, Haila
- Baba Karam Singh Public School, Daulatpur
- U.k. Model High School, Langroya

== Transport ==
Nawanshahr railway station is the nearest train station however, Garhshankar Junction railway station is 17 kilometres (11 mi) away from the village. Sahnewal Airport is the nearest domestic airport which located 61 kilometres (38 mi) away in Ludhiana and the nearest international airport is located in Chandigarh also Sri Guru Ram Dass Jee International Airport is the second nearest airport which is 163 kilometres (101 mi) away in Amritsar.

== See also ==
- List of villages in India
