= Hussain Chak =

- Village
- Location in Punjab, India Hussain Chak (India)
- Coordinates: 31.0916582°N 76.090697°E
- Country: India
- State: Punjab
- District: Shaheed Bhagat Singh Nagar

Government
  - Type: Panchayat raj
  - Body: Gram panchayat
- Elevation: 355 m (1,165 ft)

Population (2011)
  - Total: 439
- Sex ratio 223/216 ♂/♀

Languages
  - Official: Punjabi
- Time zone: UTC+5:30 (IST)
- PIN: 144518
- Telephone code: 01823
- ISO 3166 code: IN-PB
- Post office: Garcha
- Website: nawanshahr.nic.in

Hussain Chak is a village in Shaheed Bhagat Singh Nagar district of Punjab, India, 6 kilometres (3.7 mi) from district headquarters Shaheed Bhagat Singh Nagar and 94 kilometres (58 mi) from state capital Chandigarh. The village is administrated by an elected sarpanch.

== History ==
Up until 200 years ago, the inhabitants of Hussain Chak lived in a village close to the banks of the Sutlej river. The river changed course and flooded the village plain; the inhabitants then moved to the area where the village Hussain Chak is now located. The village was named after a Muslim called Hussain Ali. Pre Partition (1947), Hussain Chak was a majority Muslim village. After partition the Muslims moved to Sialkot in Pakistan.

== Demography ==
As of 2011, Hussain Chak has a total number of 81 houses and population of 439 of which 223 include are males while 216 are females according to the report published by Census India in 2011. The literacy rate of Hussain Chak is 83.20%, higher than the state average of 75.84%. The population of children under the age of 6 years is 52 which is 11.85% of total population of Hussain Chak, and child sex ratio is approximately 677 as compared to Punjab state average of 846.

Most of the people are from Schedule Castes which constitute 80.87% of the population. The town does not have any Schedule Tribe population.

As per the report published by Census India in 2011, 123 people were engaged in work activities out of the total population of Hussain Chak which includes 110 males and 13 females. According to census survey report 2011, 95.12% workers describe their work as main work and 4.88% workers are involved in activities providing work for less than six months.

== Education ==
The village has a Punjabi language, co-ed primary school founded in 1972.

== See also ==
- List of villages in India
