= Langroya =

Village in Punjab, India

Coordinates: 31.1040°N 76.1682°E

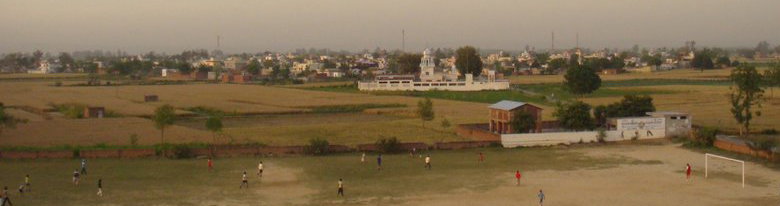
Football ground with Shamshan Ghat, Gurudwara Bohran Wala, and the village in the background

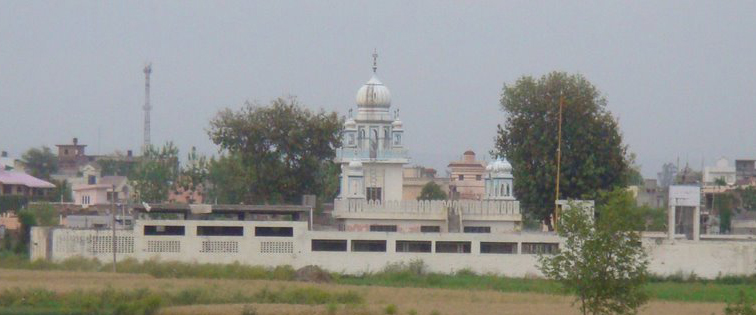
Gurudwara Bohran Wala

Langroya is a village situated on Chandigarh Road near Nawanshahr in Shaheed Bhagat Singh Nagar district, Punjab, India. Its population is about 10,000.

== Facilities ==
Langroya has two big gurudwaras and several other temples, including Mata Da Mandir, Shiv Duala, Kutiya Sant Baba Karam Singh and Jhunda Ji. There is a senior secondary school, post office, telephone exchange, Punjab National Bank, Cooperative Bank, a community health center, and a veterinary hospital. There is a Kutiya of Baba Kukar Dass.
