= Children's LoveCastles Trust =

Indian non-governmental organization

CLT India
- Children's LoveCastles Trust
- Formation: 1997; 29 years ago
- Founder: Bhagya Rangachar
- Founded at: Bangalore, India
- Type: Non-profit Organisation
- Headquarters: Jakkur, Bengaluru
- Location: Bengaluru Urban, Karnataka
- Region served: India
- Fields: Education, E- Learning, Digital Education
- Official language: English, Hindi, Kannada
- Subsidiaries: CLT International Foundation
- Website: cltindia.org

CLT India (registered as Children's LoveCastles Trust) is an Indian non-profit, non-government organisation based in Jakkur, Bengaluru. It was founded in 1997 by Bhagya Rangachar. It aims to provide education using technology to the under-served communities and its solutions serve the base of the pyramid.

It operates an e-learning delivery model. This model has been implemented in government schools across Karnataka, Rajasthan, Maharashtra, Andhra Pradesh, among other states in India.

CLT India is a certified GuideStar Gold level participant. In an impact assessment study by Christ (Deemed to be University), Bangalore, it was found that 83% schools which were a part of the CLT India’s e-Shala program reported increased enrollments and 72% schools reported reduction in dropouts from their academic course. It was chosen as a Dasra fellow for their Research Publication in partnership with USAID as one of the few change makers that are making a difference in the way girls are impacted in secondary schools. Having scaled up the low cost technology model, CLT's e-Patashale content runs in over 12,000 classrooms in India today.

== Key intervention ==
CLT India addresses some of the challenges in the rural school education system of India like shortage of teachers with subject expertise, student disengagement and lack of quality learning resources.

=== e-Patashale ===
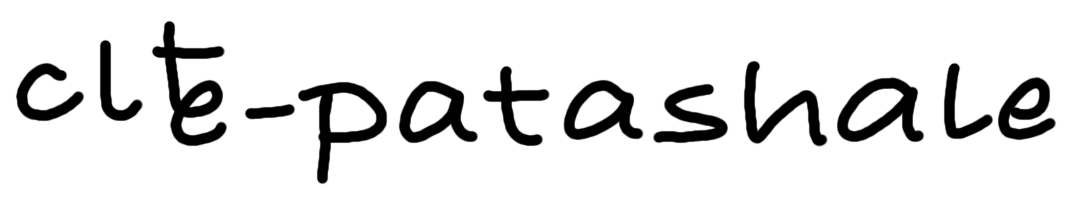
e-Patashale

e-Patashale is a low-cost digital content repository based on the national curriculum (NCERT) adopted by state board schools in India, facilitating improved learning outcomes for government-run school beneficiaries.

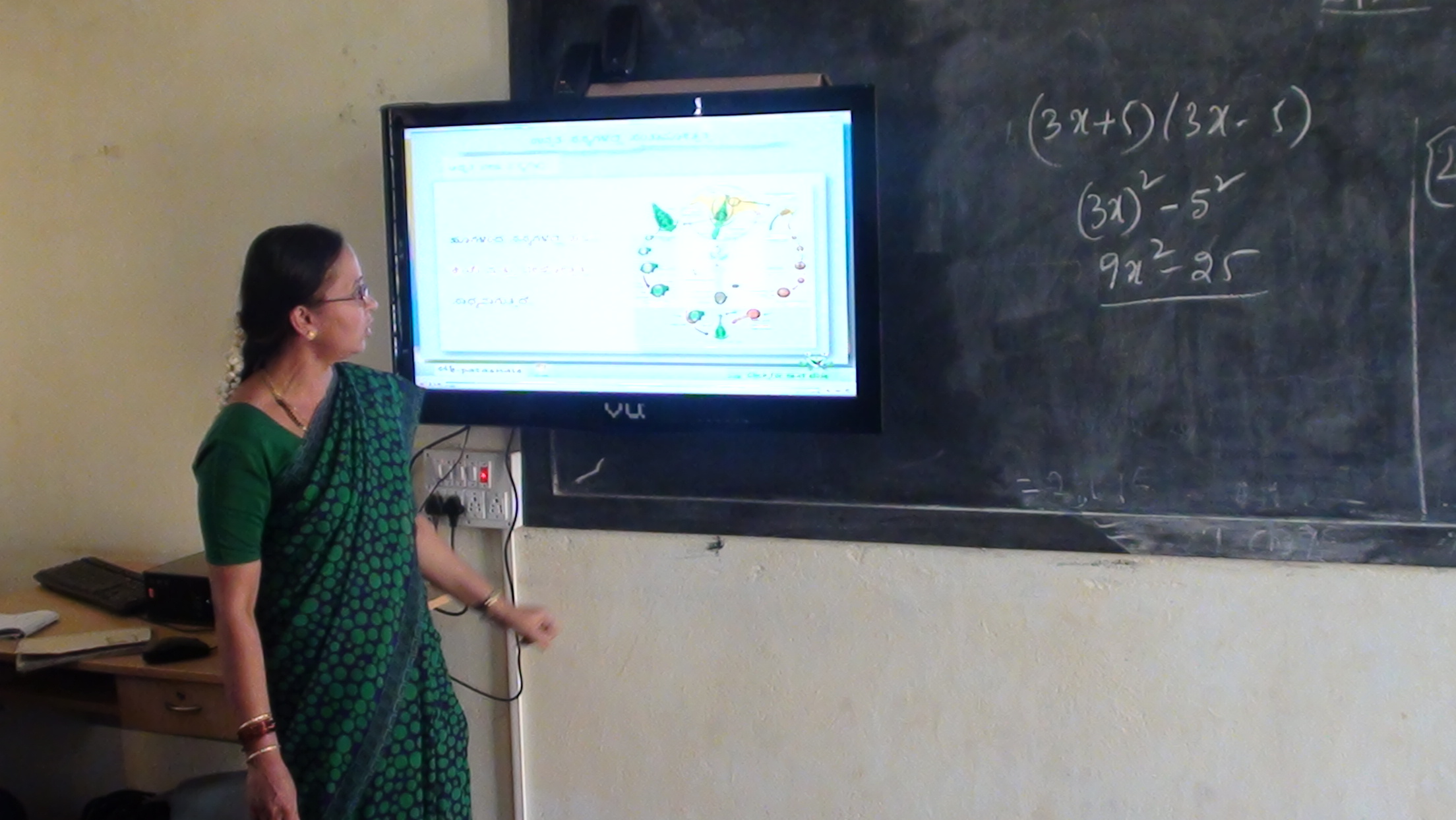
A teacher using e-Patashale

CLT Resource Centre acts as a hub where pedagogy experts gather and develop educational content.

It is now an extensive library of teaching resources for Mathematics, Science and English Grammar courseware for grades 5 to 10. It features interactive multimedia content like videos, slides and PDFs. In addition to notes, it also offers assessments based on the Continuous and Comprehensive Evaluation (CCE). It is currently available in English, Hindi and Kannada. e-Patashale follows the national curriculum closely and is approved and recommended by the State Departments of Education. It is currently available on Windows and Android devices, including PCs, tablets and mobile smartphones. It can be accessed in both non-connectivity environment and online environment as courseware videos and ebooks.

== Other programs ==
The organization began its digital education program in 2006 when it started creating educational content for government schools. Prior to this, it was involved in providing mid-day meals to various government schools in Bangalore and had also started a food-bank programme. However, these programs were later scrapped after the Karnataka State Government implemented the midday meal scheme in Jakkur.

=== Intel Computer Clubhouse ===
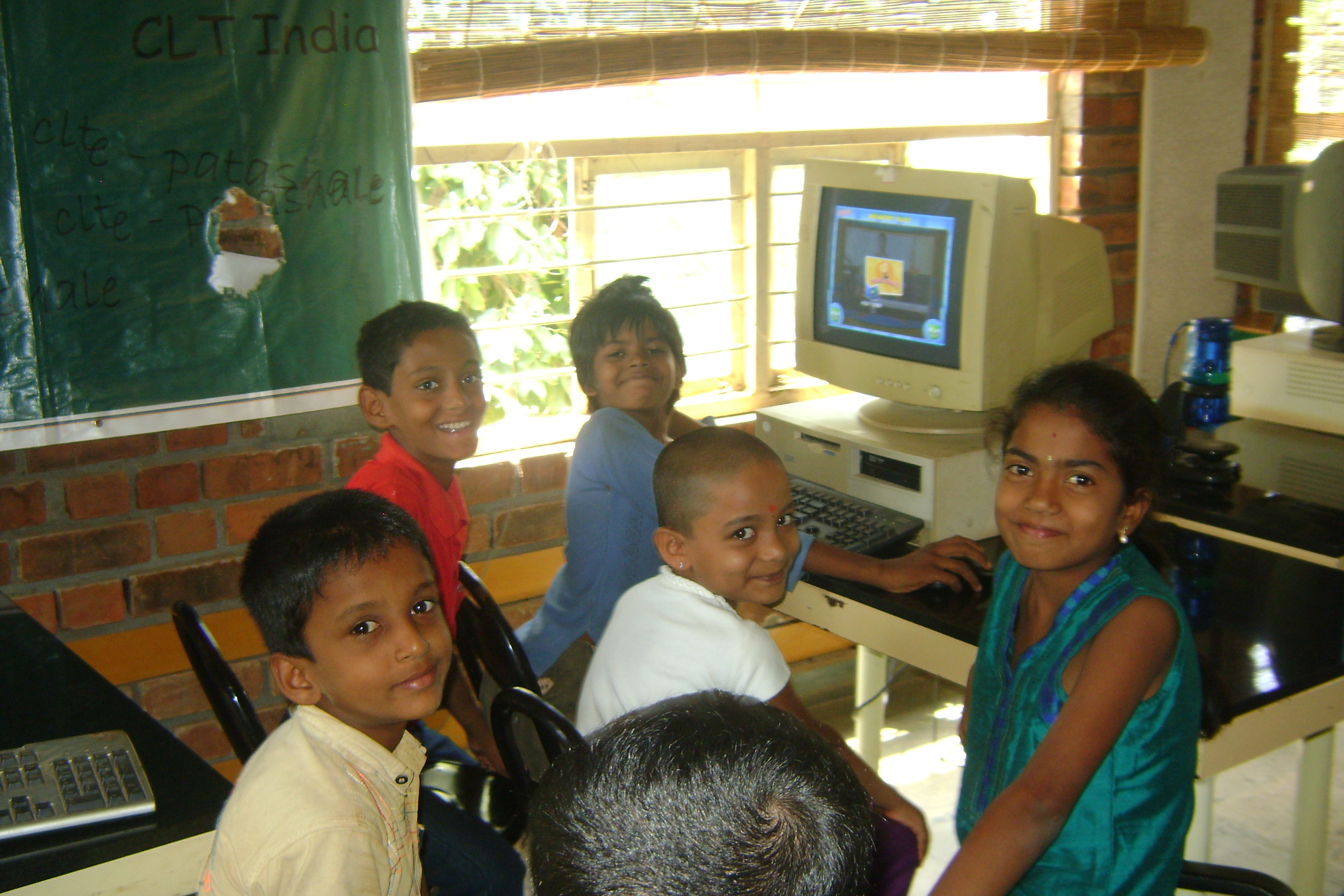
Children enjoying their time at the clubhouse

In addition to during-school intervention programmes, CLT India also provides after-school intervention. CLT India was selected to host the second Intel Computer Clubhouse in 2002. It is an after-school center for 750 children, ages 9–19, from Jakkur village in Bangalore. Under the guidance of adult mentors, children develop technology skills and create digital projects. Every two years, three children from the clubhouse go to Boston to take part in the Teen Summit, a week-long international youth leadership programme. CLT India is also part of the Adobe Youth Voices program since 2008.

=== E-Learning ===
With the help of its digital education content repository e-Patashale, the organization has catered to the growing needs of rural education in India. The organization helped set up a total of 300 E-learning classrooms between 2007 and 2010.

=== Distance Education ===
CLT also partnered with Cisco for live distance-teaching in 2011. CLT provided the education content which was delivered remotely using the Cisco® Education Enabled Development (CEED) platform. The program was implemented in 42 classrooms over the period of 2011 to 2014.
