= Balachaur =

- city
- Location in Punjab, India
- Coordinates: 31.0667°N 76.3167°E
- Country: India
- State: Punjab
- District: Nawanshahr

Population (2011)
  - Total: 21,631

Languages
  - Official: Punjabi
- Time zone: UTC+5:30 (IST)
- Vehicle registration: PB 20

Balachaur is the chief town of Balachaur tehsil in the Shaheed Bhagat Singh Nagar District of Punjab, India.

== History ==
The royal family of Jaipur visited Balachaur with their family for meditation and named the tehsil "Balachaur" after their son, Balraj. In 1539, The founder of the Sur Empire Sher Shah Suri is believed to have sought the blessings of Raj Dev before launching his attack on Mughal emperor Humayun. Raj Dev died in 1596, and in his honour, the locals constructed a tomb in the tehsil, where he is revered as Baba Balraj.

In 1949, the Balraj Mandir Committee was formed, with Zaildar Balwant Singh serving as its first president. The current president of the committee is Rana Purshotam Singh.

== Demographics ==
Balachaur is a Municipal Council city in the district of Shaheed Bhagat Singh Nagar, Punjab. The city is divided into 13 wards, with elections held every five years. According to the 2011 Census of India, the population of Balachaur Municipal Council is 21,631, comprising 11,180 males and 10,451 females. The scheduled census of 2021 for Balachaur city was postponed due to covid. The latest population census for Balachaur city will be conducted in 2025.

Balachaur serves as an important tehsil for nearby villages, hosting Punjab government offices that cater to the administrative needs of the local population. Historically, Balachaur lacked access to higher education, but it now boasts Baba Balraj Government College, located on Bhaddi Road, providing educational opportunities for the region.

== Commerce ==
The main source of income in Balachaur is agriculture, with wheat and maize being the two main crops. Many people work in the government or private sectors in neighboring towns and cities, primarily Nawanshahr, Ropar, Ludhiana, and Chandigarh. There is a big market that serves the people of Balachaur and nearby villages. Balachaur also has a big grain market (Anaaj Mandi) where the field produce is sold to wholesalers. The S.V. Cold Drink factory, which was set up in 2003, manufactures Lava Cold Drinks in Sudha Mazra (Balachaur).

== Transport ==
Balachaur is well connected by roads to all major cities in Punjab. Balachaur is on the main highway to Jallandhar, located off a highway that goes to Pathankot/Jammu. The nearest railway station is Garhshankar and the nearest airport is Chandigarh. From Balachaur there are buses (both private and public) available for passengers to go to major cities of Punjab as well as Himachal, Haryana, and Delhi. Various other modes of transportation are also available for local travel. Balachaur is a Tehsil, situated almost equidistant from Nawanshahr (20 km or 12 mi), Roopnagar (25 km), Garshankar (25 km), and Nurpur Bedi (24 km). Other big cities near Balachaur are Ludhiana (70 km or 43 mi), Chandigarh (68 km), Hoshiarpur (70 km), Anandpur Sahib (68 km), and Jalandhar (75 km). The national capital, Delhi, is 320 km (200 mi) from Balachaur.

== Villages ==
Balachaur Tehsil has a total of 185 Villages in its jurisdiction. Sahdra is a village that belongs to Balachaur Tehsil located near Majari. It has two Gurudwaras and a secondary school. Sudha Majra Alais Fatehgarh is situated on the Chandigarh Jalandhar highways. There is a historical Gurudwara Tahli Shaib built in memory of Guru Hargobind Singh Ji. It had a population of 1,200.

Gahoon (Punjabi-ਗਹੁੰਣ) is named for the people who lived on the bank of the sea called ("ਗਾਹਣਿਅੇ"). According to the 2001 India census, Gahoon had a population of 1,100: 53% male and 47% female. Gahoon has an average literacy rate of 72.6% with 56% males and 44% females. Fifteen percent (15%) of the population is under 6 years of age.

Garhi Kanugoan (ਗੜੀ ਕਾਨੂੰਗੋਅਾਂ) is located on Nawanshahr road. There is a historical and oldest Shiv Mandir, Gurdwara of Baba Jawahar Singh Ji (Falahi Sahib) Main Gurdwara Sahib, Gurdwara Sahidan Sahib, Patka Sahib, Majar Baba Roshan Shah Wali, and this village is located nearly midway between 4 main cities: 72 km (45 mi) from Chandigarh, 73 km from Jalandhar, 65 km (40 mi) from Hoshiarpur and 65 km from Ludhiana, village Thopia 4 km.

Taunsa is located on the mohali phagwara highway and is surrounded by a plethora of pharmaceutical companies, namely Sun Pharma, Centrient, Health Caps and many more. This village provides residence to many employees working in these firms; most of the labor comes from the states of Uttar Pradesh and Bihar. The market of Taunsa is well known by the neighbouring villages such as Rel majra, Banah, Tajowal, Majran Jattan.
