= Kahlon, SBS Nagar =

Kahlon
- Village
- Location in Punjab, India Kahlon (India)
- Coordinates: 31.0407802°N 76.0930591°E
- Country: India
- State: Punjab
- District: Shaheed Bhagat Singh Nagar

Government
  - Type: Panchayat raj
  - Body: Gram panchayat
- Elevation: 254 m (833 ft)

Population (2011)
  - Total: 1,377
- Sex ratio 677/700 ♂/♀

Languages
  - Official: Punjabi
- Time zone: UTC+5:30 (IST)
- PIN: 144517
- Telephone code: 01823
- ISO 3166 code: IN-PB
- Post office: Rahon
- Website: nawanshahr.nic.in

Kahlon is a village in Shaheed Bhagat Singh Nagar district of Punjab State, India. It is located 3.8 kilometres (2.4 mi) away from postal head office Rahon, 11 kilometres (6.8 mi) from Nawanshahr, 12.7 kilometres (7.9 mi) from district headquarter Shaheed Bhagat Singh Nagar and 92.7 kilometres (57.6 mi) from state capital Chandigarh. The village is administrated by Sarpanch an elected representative of the village.

== Demography ==
As of 2011, Kahlon has a total number of 272 houses and population of 1377 of which 677 include are males while 700 are females according to the report published by Census India in 2011. The literacy rate of Kahlon is 76.15%, higher than the state average of 75.84%. The population of children under the age of 6 years is 136 which is 9.88% of total population of Kahlon, and child sex ratio is approximately 789 as compared to Punjab state average of 846.

Most of the people are from Schedule Caste which constitutes 41.83% of total population in Kahlon. The town does not have any Schedule Tribe population so far.

As per the report published by Census India in 2011, 459 people were engaged in work activities out of the total population of Kahlon which includes 361 males and 98 females. According to census survey report 2011, 83.44% workers describe their work as main work and 16.56% workers are involved in Marginal activity providing livelihood for less than 6 months.

== Education ==
The village has a Punjabi medium, co-ed primary school founded in 1961. The schools provide mid-day meal as per Indian Midday Meal Scheme and the meal prepared in school premises. As per Right of Children to Free and Compulsory Education Act the school provide free education to children between the ages of 6 and 14.

KC Engineering College and Doaba Khalsa Trust Group Of Institutions are the nearest colleges. Industrial Training Institute for women (ITI Nawanshahr) is 24 kilometres (15 mi). The village is 69 kilometres (43 mi) away from Chandigarh University, 51 kilometres (32 mi) from Indian Institute of Technology and 56 kilometres (35 mi) away from Lovely Professional University.

List of schools nearby:

- K.C. Public School, Nawanshahr
- GSSS Haila, Haila
- Baba Karam Singh Public School, Daulatpur
- U.K. Model High School, Langroya

== Transport ==
Nawanshahr railway station is the nearest train station however, Garhshankar Junction railway station is 23 kilometres (14 mi) away from the village. Sahnewal Airport is the nearest domestic airport which located 50 kilometres (31 mi) away in Ludhiana and the nearest international airport is located in Chandigarh also Sri Guru Ram Dass Jee International Airport is the second nearest airport which is 164 kilometres (102 mi) away in Amritsar.

== See also ==
- List of villages in India
