= Garcha, SBS Nagar =

Garcha
- Village
- Location in Punjab, India Garcha (India)
- Coordinates: 31.0731342°N 76.0332655°E
- Country: India
- State: Punjab
- District: Shaheed Bhagat Singh Nagar

Government
  - Type: Panchayat raj
  - Body: Gram panchayat
- Elevation: 254 m (833 ft)

Population (2011)
  - Total: 2,078
- Sex ratio 1031/1047 ♂/♀

Languages
  - Official: Punjabi
- Time zone: UTC+5:30 (IST)
- PIN: 144518
- Telephone code: 01823
- ISO 3166 code: IN-PB
- Post office: Garcha
- Website: nawanshahr.nic.in

Garcha is a village in Shaheed Bhagat Singh Nagar district of Punjab State, India. It is located 8.6 kilometres (5.3 mi) away from Rahon, 10.6 kilometres (6.6 mi) from Nawanshahr, 2.2 kilometres (1.4 mi) from district headquarter Shaheed Bhagat Singh Nagar and 96 kilometres (60 mi) from state capital Chandigarh. The village is administrated by Sarpanch an elected representative of the village.

== Demography ==
As of 2011, Garcha has a total number of 454 houses and population of 2078 of which 1031 include are males while 1047 are females according to the report published by Census India in 2011. The literacy rate of Garcha is 82.02%, higher than the state average of 75.84%. The population of children under the age of 6 years is 170 which is 8.18% of total population of Garcha, and child sex ratio is approximately 910 as compared to Punjab state average of 846.

Most of the people are from Schedule Caste which constitutes 45.28% of total population in Garcha. The town does not have any Schedule Tribe population so far.

As per the report published by Census India in 2011, 630 people were engaged in work activities out of the total population of Garcha which includes 580 males and 50 females. According to census survey report 2011, 90.95% workers describe their work as main work and 9.05% workers are involved in Marginal activity providing livelihood for less than 6 months.

== Education ==
The village has a Punjabi medium, co-ed primary and a high school founded in 1972. The schools provide mid-day meal. The school provide free education to children between the ages of 6 and 14 as per Right of Children to Free and Compulsory Education Act. KC Engineering College and Doaba Khalsa Trust Group Of Institutions are the nearest colleges. Industrial Training Institute for women (ITI Nawanshahr) is 12.9 kilometres (8.0 mi) and Lovely Professional University is 45 kilometres (28 mi) away from the village.

== Transport ==
Nawanshahr railway station is the nearest train station however, Garhshankar Junction railway station is 27 kilometres (17 mi) away from the village. Sahnewal Airport is the nearest domestic airport which located 55 kilometres (34 mi) away in Ludhiana and the nearest international airport is located in Chandigarh also Sri Guru Ram Dass Jee International Airport is the second nearest airport which is 154 kilometres (96 mi) away in Amritsar.

== See also ==
- List of villages in India
