= Midday Meal Scheme =

Lunch program for students in India

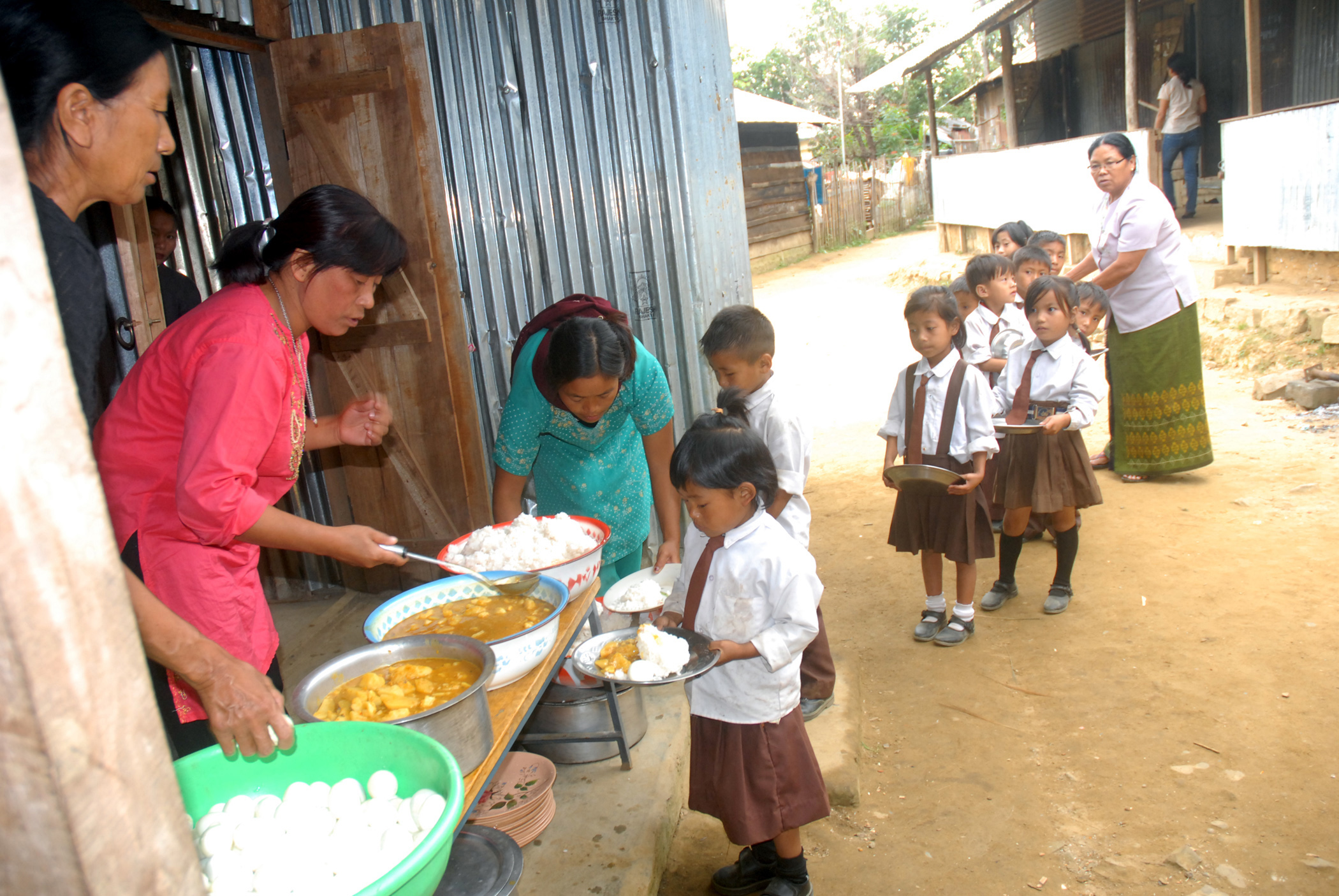
- Students receiving mid-day meal at a school in Wokha district of Nagaland state
- Type of project: Government of India
- Country: India
- Launched: 1995
- Status: Active
- Website: https://pmposhan.education.gov.in/

The Midday Meal Scheme (PM-Poshan Shakti Nirman) is a free school meal programme in India designed to enhance the nutritional status of school-age children nationwide. The programme supplies free lunches on working days for children in government primary and upper primary schools, government-aided anganwadis (pre-school), madrasas and maqtabs. Serving 120 million children in over 1.27 million schools and Education Guarantee Scheme centres, the Midday Meal Scheme is the largest of its kind in the world.

In 1920, A. Subbarayalu Reddiar, the first Chief Minister of the Madras Presidency, introduced the mid-day meal scheme in a Corporation school in the Thousand Lights area. The initiative was based on the idea proposed by P. Theagaraya Chetty, who was serving as the President of the Justice Party at the time.

The Midday Meal Scheme has been implemented in the Union Territory of Puducherry under the French Administration since 1930. In post-independent India, the Midday Meal Scheme was first launched in Tamil Nadu, pioneered by the former Chief Minister K. Kamaraj in the early 1960s. By 2002, the scheme was implemented in all of the states under the orders of the Supreme Court of India.

In 2021, the Central Government announced that an additional 2.4 million students receiving pre-primary education at government and government-aided schools would also be included under the scheme by 2022.

Under article 24, paragraph 2c of the Convention on the Rights of the Child, to which India is a party, India has committed to yielding "adequate nutritious food" for children. The programme has undergone many changes since its launch in 1995. The Midday Meal Scheme is covered by the National Food Security Act, 2013. The legal backing for the Indian school meal programme is akin to the legal backing provided in the US through the National School Lunch Act.

== History ==
The Midday Meal Scheme refers to the government of India programme introduced in all government elementary schools to provide children with cooked lunches. Tamil Nadu was the first state in India to introduce this scheme. The first school which had the scheme was the Sourashtra Boys Higher Secondary School, Madurai, which implemented it in 1955. On 28 November 2001 the Supreme Court asked all state governments to begin this programme in their schools within 6 months. The programme has shown many positive effects. Many parents who couldn't send their children to schools due to poverty, were eager to get their children free nutritious food and this incentivized them to send their children to school. The Midday Meal Scheme increased the number of school-going children.

=== Roots of the programme ===
The roots of the programme can be traced back to the pre-independence era, when a midday meal programme was introduced in 1925 in Tamil Nadu. Initiatives by state governments began in the 1962–63 school year.

The Indian state Tamil Nadu was a pioneer in introducing midday meal programmes in India to increase the number of children enrolling in school; K. Kamaraj, the Chief Minister of Tamil Nadu at the time, introduced it first in Chennai and later extended it to all districts of Tamil Nadu. During 1982, 1 July onwards, the Chief Minister of Tamil Nadu, M. G. Ramachandran upgraded the existing midday meal scheme in the state to 'Nutritious noon-meal scheme' keeping in mind that around 68 lakh children were malnourished. Gujarat was the second state to introduce an MDM scheme in 1984, but it was later discontinued.

A midday meal scheme was introduced in Kerala in 1984, and was gradually expanded to include more schools and grades. By 1990–91, twelve states were funding the scheme to all or most of the students in their area: Goa, Gujarat, Kerala, Madhya Pradesh, Maharashtra, Meghalaya, Mizoram, Nagaland, Sikkim, Tamil Nadu, Tripura and Uttar Pradesh. Karnataka, Odisha and West Bengal received international aid to help with the implementation of the programme, while in AP and Rajasthan the programme was completely funded by foreign aid.

In Karnataka, the Children's LoveCastles Trust started providing midday meals in 1997. A total of eight schools were adopted and a food bank programme and an Angganwasi milk Programme were started. The food-bank programme was replaced by the State Government midday meal scheme.

=== Initiatives by the central government ===
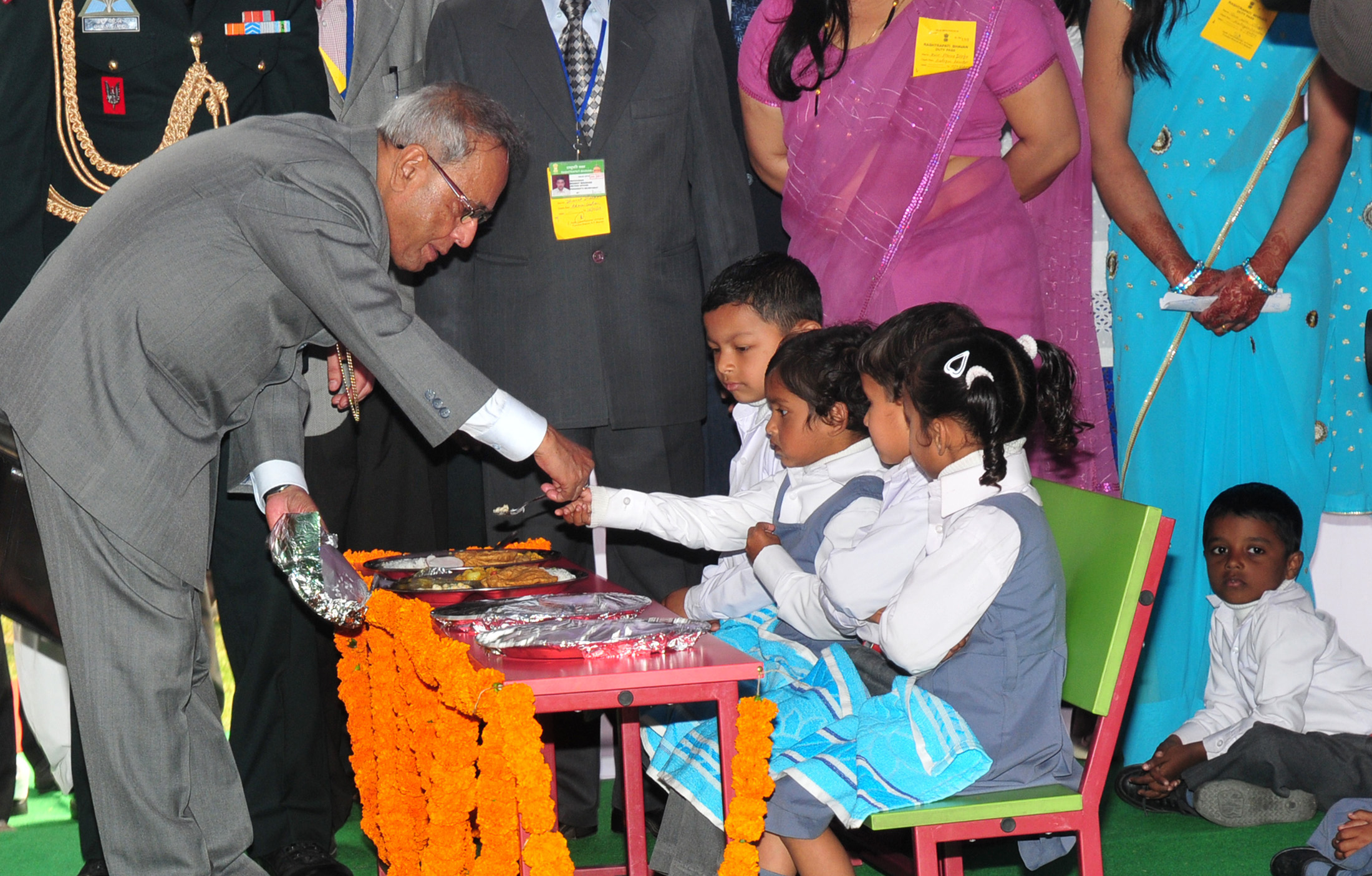
President Pranab Mukherjee launching mid-day meal scheme at a Central Government-run school

The government of India initiated the National Programme of Nutritional Support to Primary Education (NP-NSPE) on 15 August 1995. The objective of the scheme is to help improve the effectiveness of primary education by improving the nutritional status of primary school children. Initially, the scheme was implemented in 2,408 blocks of the country to provide food to students in classes one through five of government, government-aided and local body run schools. By 1997–98, the scheme had been implemented across the country. Under this programme, a cooked midday meal with 300 calories and 12 grams of protein is provided to all children enrolled in classes one to five. In October 2007, the scheme included students in upper primary classes of six to eight in 3,479 educationally backward blocks, and the name was changed from National Programme for Nutrition Support to Primary Education to National Programme of Mid Day Meals in Schools. Though cooked food was to be provided, most states (apart from those already providing cooked food) chose to provide "dry rations" to students. "Dry rations" refers to the provision of uncooked 3 kg of wheat or rice to children with 80% attendance.

=== Supreme court order ===
In April 2001, the People's Union for Civil Liberties (PUCL) initiated the Public Interest Litigation (Civil) No. 196/2001, People's Union for Civil Liberties v. Union of India & Others – popularly known as the "right to food" case. The PUCL argued that article 21 – "right to life" of the Indian constitution when read together with articles 39(a) and 47, makes the right to food a derived fundamental right which is enforceable by virtue of the constitutional remedy provided under article 32 of the constitution. The PUCL argued that excess food stocks with the Food Corporation of India should be fed to hungry citizens. This included providing midday meals in primary schools. The scheme came into force with the supreme court order dated 28 November 2001, which requires all government and government-assisted primary schools to provide cooked midday meals.

==== Interim orders ====
The Supreme Court occasionally issues interim orders regarding midday meals. Some examples are:

Order regarding	Exact text	Order dated
Basic entitlement	"Every child in every place and Government assisted Primary Schools with a prepared midday meal with a minimum content of 300 calories and 8–12 grams of protein each day of school for a minimum of 200 days"	28 November 2001
Charges on conversion cost	"The conversion costs for a cooked meal, under no circumstances, shall be recovered from the children or their parents"	20 April 2004
Central assistance	"The Central Government... shall also allocate funds to meet with the conversion costs of food-grains into cooked midday meals"	20 April 2004
Kitchen sheds	"The Central Government shall make provisions for construction of kitchen sheds"	20 April 2004
Priority to Dalit cooks	"In appointment of cooks and helpers, preference shall be given to Dalits, Scheduled Castes and Scheduled Tribes"	20 April 2004
Quality safeguards	"Attempts shall be made for better infrastructure, improved facilities (safe drinking water etc.), closer monitoring (regular inspection etc.) and other quality safeguards as also the improvement of the contents of the meal so as to provide nutritious meal to the children of the primary schools"	20 April 2004
Drought areas	"In drought affected areas, midday meals shall be supplied even during summer vacations"	20 April 2004

=== Entitlements ===
The nutritional guidelines for the minimum amount of food and calorie content per child per day are:

Entitlement norm per child per day under MDM
Item	Primary (class one to five)	Upper primary ll (class six to eight)
Calories	450	700
Protein (in grams)	12	20
Rice / wheat (in grams)	100	150
Dal (in grams)	20	30
Vegetables (in grams)	50	75
Oil and fat (in grams)	5	7.5

In the case of micronutrients (vitamin A, iron, and folate) tablets and de-worming medicines, the student is entitled to receive the amount provided for in the school health programme of the National Rural Health Mission.

The overall responsibility for providing hot cooked nutritious meals lies with State Governments and UT administrations. States/UTs are specifically allowed/encouraged to decide menus suited to local conditions, including local foods such as millets, vegetables, condiments, etc., but only within the prescribed nutrition and food norms. Many States/UTs provide such additional supplementary nutrition interventions by introducing items like egg, milk, fruits, chikki, ragi malt, chicken, etc.

=== Finances ===
The central and state governments share the cost of the Midday Meal Scheme, with the centre providing 60 percent and the states 40 percent. The central government provides grains and financing for other food. Costs for facilities, transportation, and labour is shared by the federal and state governments. The participating states/territories contribute different amounts of money, depending on whether they are Himalayan states, Northeastern Region (NER) states, union territories without legislature, or the residual (Non-NER states and union territories with legislature). The share contributed by states is often larger than what is stipulated. While the eleventh five-year plan allocated ₹384.9 billion (equivalent to ₹490 billion or US$5.1 billion in 2026) for the scheme, the twelfth five-year plan has allocated ₹901.55 billion (US$9.4 billion), a 134 percent rise. The public expenditure for the Mid Day Meal Programme has gone up from ₹73.24 billion (US$760 million) in 2007–08 to ₹132.15 billion (US$1.4 billion) in 2013–14. In 2020–21, the Midday Meal Scheme budget comprised 11% of the total budget for the Ministry of Education. The per day cooking cost per child at the primary level has been fixed to ₹4.13 (4.3¢ US) while at the upper primary level is ₹6.18 (6.4¢ US). As of FY24 - 25, the budget estimate of the PM Poshan Scheme stands at Rs. 12,467.39 crore (US$ 1.49 billion).

=== Implementation models ===
==== Decentralised model ====
This is the most widespread practice. In the decentralised model, meals are cooked on-site by local cooks and helpers or self-help groups. This system has the advantage of being able to serve local cuisine, providing jobs in the area, and minimising waste. It also allows for better monitoring (e.g., by parents and teachers). In total, the MDM Scheme employs over 2.5 million cooks/food preparers (referred to as cooks-cum-helpers), usually providing a small honorarium for their work (equal to approximately US$14 per month).

In the absence of adequate infrastructure (such as kitchen sheds, utensils etc.), it can lead to accidents and maintaining hygiene can be difficult. In 2004, 87 children died when the thatched roof of a classroom was ignited by sparks from a cooking fire. In 2011, a child died after succumbing to burn injuries she sustained after accidentally falling into a cooking vessel.

==== Centralised model ====
In the centralised model, an external organisation cooks and delivers the meal to schools, mostly through public-private partnerships. Centralised kitchens are seen more in urban areas, where density of schools is high so that transporting food is a financially viable option. Advantages of centralised kitchens include ensuring better hygienic as large scale cooking is done through largely automated processes. Various NGOs such as the Nalabothu Foundation, Akshaya Patra Foundation, Ekta Shakti Foundation, Naandi Foundation, and Jay Gee Humanitarian Society provide midday meals.

A study of centralised kitchens in Delhi in 2007 found that even with centralised kitchens, the quality of food needed to be improved. The study also found that when the food arrives and is of inadequate quality, even teachers feel helpless and do not know whom to complain to.

The Ministry of Human Resource Development reported that 95% of tested meal samples prepared by NGOs in Delhi did not meet nutritional standards in 2010–12. In response, the ministry withheld 50% of the payment for the deficient meals.

==== International assistance ====
International voluntary and charity organisations have assisted. Church World Service has provided milk powder to Delhi and Madras Municipal Corporation; CARE has provided corn soya meal, Bulgar wheat, and vegetable oils; and UNICEF has provided high proteins foods and educational support. In 1982, 'Food for Learning' was launched with assistance from the Food and Agriculture Organization (FAO). Initially the programme was aimed at scheduled caste and scheduled tribe girls. In 1983, the federal Department of Education prepared a scheme under the auspices of the World Food Programme to supply meals to 13.6 million scheduled caste girls and 10.09 million scheduled tribe girls in classes one to five in 15 states and three union territories. The value of the food itself was $163.27 million per year. Labour, facilities, and transportation costs were to be paid by the state governments. The reaction among the states and union territories was mixed. Many states were interested, but some were concerned about their ability to afford it if the FAO support were to be withdrawn.

=== Tithi Bhojan ===
Tithi Bhojan is a concept designed to ensure greater public participation under the Midday Meal Programme, that started out in the state of Gujarat. In order to generate greater community participation, local members were encouraged to celebrate social events like birth of a child and homewarming by donating to the midday meals served in the local schools. It is voluntarily served by the community/family among school children in several forms such as sweets and savoury snacks, along with regular MDM, full meals, supplementary nutritive items like sprouted beans, and contributions in kind such as cookware, utensils, dinner sets or glasses for drinking water. The concept has been adopted by 10 other states, some with local nomenclatures like "Sampriti Bhojan" in Assam, "Dham" in Himachal Pradesh, "Sneh Bhojan" in Maharashtra, "Shalegagi Naavu Neevu" in Karnataka, "Anna Dhanam" in Puducherry, "Priti Bhoj" in Punjab and "Utsav Bhoj" in Rajasthan. In the North Indian states of Uttarakhand, Haryana and the Union territory of Chandigarh, the scheme retains its original name of Tithi Bhojan.

== Monitoring and implementation ==
=== Monitoring mechanism ===
Committees to monitor the MDM Programme
Level	Committee	Frequency of meeting
National	The national level steering / monitoring committee Programme Approval Board (PAB)	Quarterly
State	The state level steering / monitoring committee	Quarterly
District	The district level committee	Monthly
Municipal	The municipal committee	Monthly
Block	The Mandal level committee	Fortnightly
Village	Panchayat level sub-committee	Day-to-day functioning of the implementation of the scheme
School	School management and development committee / Parent Teacher Association	Monthly and when it is required

The government of India Review Missions on Mid Day Meal Scheme, comprising members from the central government, state governments, UNICEF, and the office of the supreme court commissioner was created in 2010 to review the programme and offer suggestions for improvement. The scheme is independently monitored twice a year.

== Evaluation of the scheme ==
The MDM Scheme has many potential benefits: attracting children from disadvantaged sections (especially girls, Dalits and Adivasis) to school, improving regularity, nutritional benefits, socialisation benefits and benefits to women are some that have been highlighted.

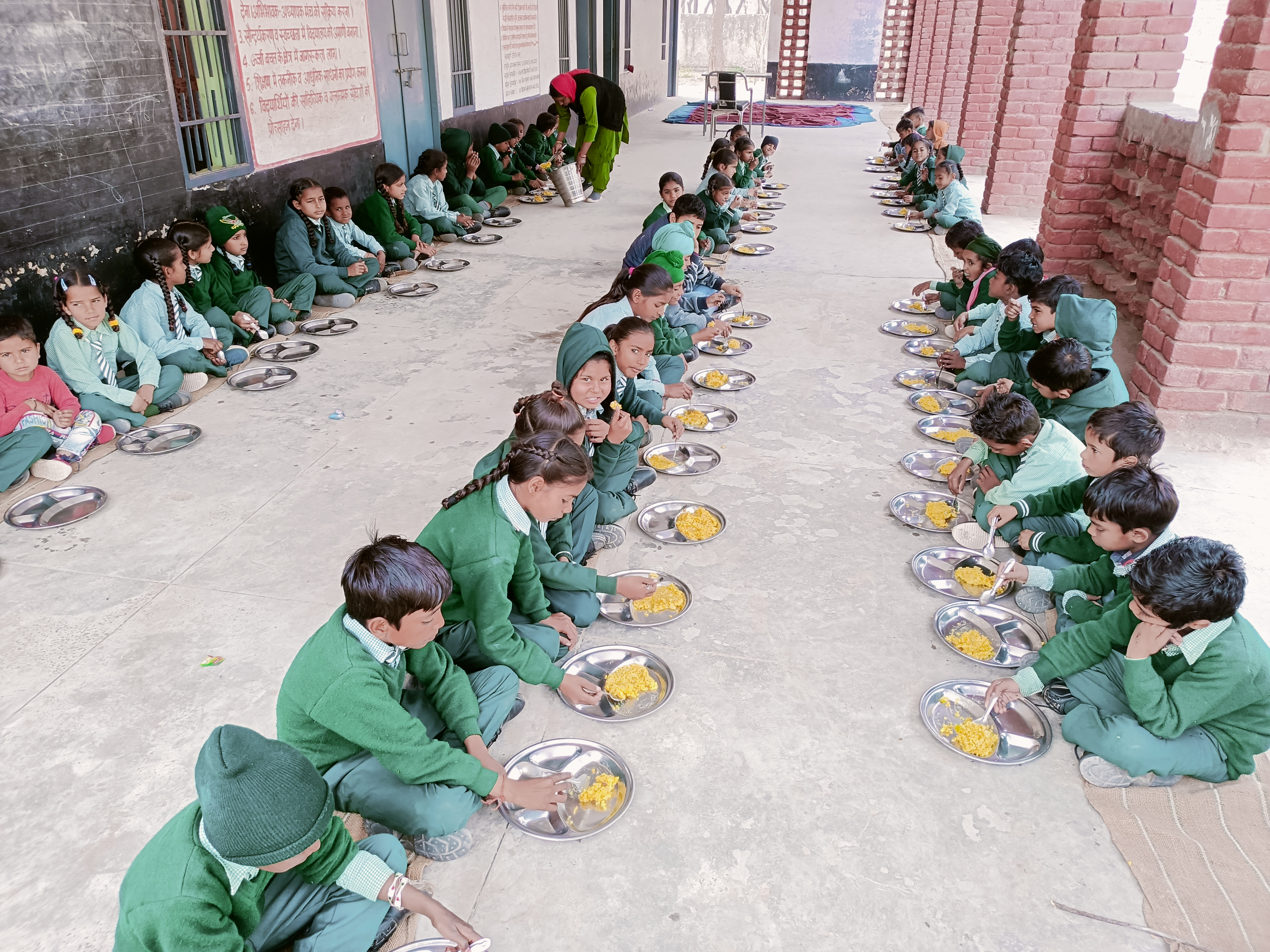
School students taking Mid day meal in a school of Haryana province of India

Studies by economists show that some of these benefits have indeed been realised. The positive effect on enrollment of disadvantaged children (Dreze and Kingdon), on attendance (by Chakraborty, Jayaraman, Pande), on learning effort (by Booruah, Afridi and Somanathan), on improving nutritional inputs (Afridi), and on improving nutritional outcomes (by Singh, Dercon and Parker). However, policy inputs by Dr Edmond Fernandes suggested that it would be wise to address the problem through a cross sectoral perspective as cascading risks globally is affecting food security & healthy nutrition.

Caste based discrimination continues to occur in the serving of food, though the government seems unwilling to acknowledge this.

Sukhdeo Thorat and Joel Lee found in their 2005 study that caste discrimination was occurring in conjunction with the Mid Day Meals programme.

Media reports also document the positive effect of the programme for women, especially working women and its popularity among parents, children and teachers alike. Media reports have also highlighted several implementation issues, including irregularity, corruption, hygiene, caste discrimination, etc. A few such incidents are listed below:

- In December 2005, Delhi police seized eight trucks laden with 2,760 sacks of rice meant for primary school children. The rice was being transported from Food Corporation of India godowns Bulandshahr district to North Delhi. The police stopped the trucks and investigators later discovered that the rice was being stolen by an NGO.
- In November 2006, the residents of Pembong village (30 km from Darjeeling) accused a group of teachers of embezzling midday meals. In a written complaint, the residents claimed that students at the primary school had not received their midday meal for the past year and a half.
- In December 2006, The Times of India reported that school staff were inflating attendance in order to obtain food grains.
- Twenty-three children died in Dharma Sati village in Saran District on 16 July 2013 after eating pesticide-contaminated mid day meals. On 31 July 2013, 55 students at a government middle school fell ill at Kalyuga village in Jamui district after their midday meal provided by an NGO. On the same day, 95 students at Chamandi primary school in Arwal district were ill after their meal.
- Over the past 20 years, the amount allocated per student under the Midday Meal Scheme (Prime Minister's Poshan Shakti Nirman) has increased by Rs. 3.45. In the year 2004–05, Rs. 2 per child was provided for classes one to five, which has now increased to Rs. 5.45, and Rs. 8.17 for classes six to eight, including the cost of cooking ingredients like rice, lentils, vegetables, spices, oil, and salt, as well as the cost of cooking gas.

== Criticism ==
Despite the success of the programme, child hunger as a problem persists in India. According to current statistics, 42.5% of the children under 5 are underweight. Some simple health measures such as using iodised salt and getting vaccinations are uncommon in India. "India is home to the world's largest food insecure population, with more than 500 million people who are hungry", India State Hunger Index (ISHI) said. Many children don't get enough to eat, which has far-reaching implications for the performance of the country as a whole. "Its rates of child malnutrition is higher than most countries in Sub-Saharan Africa," it noted. The 2009 Global Hunger Index ranked India at 65 out of 84 countries. More than 200 million went hungry in India that year, more than any other country in the world. The report states that "improving child nutrition is of utmost urgency in most Indian states".

As the MDM Scheme operates only in government/government-aided schools, it does not serve the large share of children in India who attend private schools. From 2015 to 2018, the number of children receiving food through the MDM scheme declined in many states, a pattern that may at least partly reflect the rising popularity of private schools in the country.

== See also ==
- Free school meals
- National Food Security Act, 2013
