= Nawanshahr =

City in Punjab, India

Shaheed Bhagat Singh Nagar Shaheed Bhagat Singh Nagar (Punjabi) Nawashahar
- City
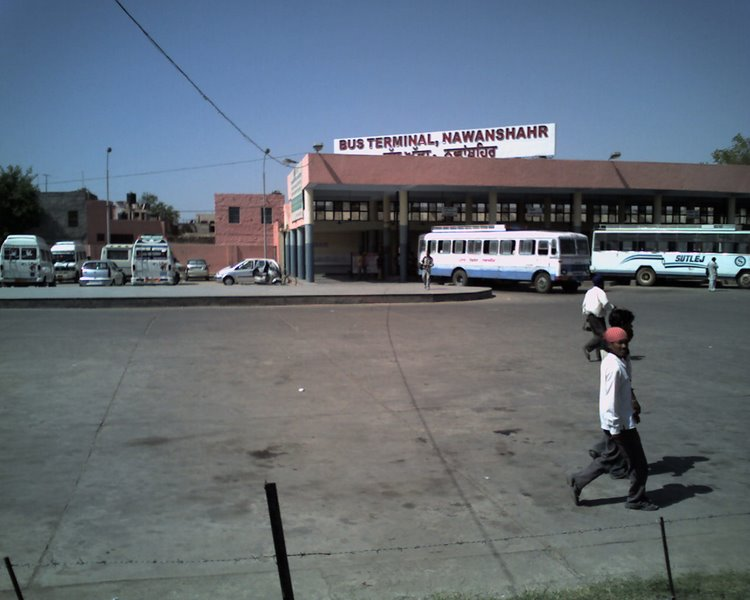

- Location in Punjab, India Shaheed Bhagat Singh Nagar (India) Shaheed Bhagat Singh Nagar (Asia)
- Coordinates: 31.1167°N 76.1333°E
- Country: India
- State: Punjab
- District: Shaheed Bhagat Singh Nagar
- Founder: Nausher Khan Afghan

Population (2011)
  - Total: 63,000

Languages
  - Official: Punjabi
- Time zone: UTC+5:30 (IST)
- PIN: 144514
- Telephone code: 01823
- Vehicle registration: PB-32

Shaheed Bhagat Singh Nagar (Punjabi pronunciation: [nə.ʋä̃ːʃɛ́ːɾ]) (formerly Nawashahar) is a city in the Indian state of Punjab. It was previously a city; it later became a district in 1995.

== History ==
Nawanshahr was founded by Nausher Khan, an Afghan, during the reign of emperor Babur. They named it Nawanshahar, which means "the new city (of Nausher Khan)".

Dewan Banna Mal Misr (Gautam) was born into the Gautam Brahmin (Shori Gotra) family of Nawanshahr. His father was Vaid, Pandit Jhanda Mal. Dewan Banna Mal was a manager with the full sovereign powers of Maharaja Sir Randhir Singh Bahadur of Kapurthala's estates in Oudh in 1862. Dewan Banna Mal became a mediator between Oudh local landlords and Rajas who rebelled against Britishers in 1857 to settle dispute between Britishers and Oudh's local Rajas. Banna Mal played a major role and served as Chief Minister of Kapurthala State. Ancestors of Dewan Banna Mal Gautam were Vaids (ayurvedic doctors). Dewan Banna Mal built the Shivala Banna Mal temple near the Municipal Committee office in Nawanshahr. He also built the large structure Haveli Banna Mal Di Haveli in Vaidan Mohalla in Nawanshahr. His son, Dewan Acchru Mal served as Revenue Minister of Kapurthala State at the time of Maharaja Kharak Singh and Maharaja Jagatjit Singh of Kapurthala.

The city was later developed and constructed by Lala Parmanand Bhuchar (Sareen). Lala Paramanand was given a mould of large brick design by Queen Elizabeth in the presence of Maharaja Patiala in his courtroom, as a token of gratitude, to settle brick factories (Batha) in the city. Lala Paramanand first planned the construction of Mandi (now known as old Dana Mandi) in around 1920 which has his name "PN" on bricks and his name on the Foundation Stone at old Dana Mandi Gate. He resided in Lalliyan Mohalla (Lalleyan da Mohalla) situated in the centre of the city. The mohalla has a haveli there along with a common haveli which was the residence of 100 families, a historical landmark in that mohalla was made with Nanakshahi bricks.

Nawanshahr became a district in 1995 during the Harcharan Brar government, with the strong efforts of the late Dilbag Singh, former Cabinet Minister, and the then MLA of Nawanshahr. People of this district are economically sound. Large numbers of families from the district have settled abroad. Consequently, huge remittance is received back in India which contributes to the district's economic development and prosperity. The prosperity of the Doaba area has grown considerably due to high land prices in the area, which is higher than that of most other districts in the state except for Ludhiana and Chandigarh. The economy of Nawanshahr is also improving due to the currency coming from overseas Punjabi people. Nawanshahr also has a railroad connecting it with Jalandhar, Rahon, and Jaijon.

On 27 September 2008, the Punjab government announced that Nawanshahr would be renamed after freedom fighter Bhagat Singh to mark his 101st birth anniversary.

== Geography ==
The total area of Nawanshahr is 1,258 square kilometres.

== Demographics ==
According to the 2001 census, Nawanshahr had a population of 587,468. This consisted of 306,902 males and 280,566 females, which meant there were 913 females for every 1000 males. The average literacy rate of Nawanshahr is 75% (male literacy is 79% and female literacy is 71%), surpassing the national average of 59.5%. In Nawanshahr, 11% of the population is under 6 years of age. The population density (per km^{2}) is 439 people. Between the 1991 census and the 2001 census, there was a 10.43% increase in population. Nawanshahr constituency is one of the 117 seats of the Punjab Vidhan Sabha and its constituency number is 47. Angad Saini, who is a member of Congress, won the last assembly election and is the current MLA of Nawanshahr.

The scheduled caste population is 45.58%.

== Transport ==
=== Air ===
As of now, there is no commercial airport in Nawanshahr. The nearest regional airport is in Sahnewal, in Ludhiana which is around 45.2 km by road South-West of Nawanshahr, has only one daily flight to Delhi Airport by Alliance Air. The nearest full-fledged International Airport is Sri Guru Ram Dass Jee International Airport in Amritsar, which is situated at a distance of about 155 km. Direct flights from key cities around the world like London, Birmingham, Singapore, Kuala Lumpur and others are available from Amritsar Airport.

=== Rail ===
Nawanshahr Doaba Junction is one of the primary railway stations in Nawanshahr. Around 6 trains pass through Nawanshahr Doaba Junction. Nawanshahr Doaba Junction code is (NSS).Nawanshahr Doaba Junction is well connected with the entire city through easy conveyance options. Parking is also available at the station. Other facilities available at the station are automatic ticket vending machines, ATM machines, information kiosks, LCD screens, internet cafes and TV advertising panels. All the basic amenities are available for passengers at the railway station.

=== Road ===
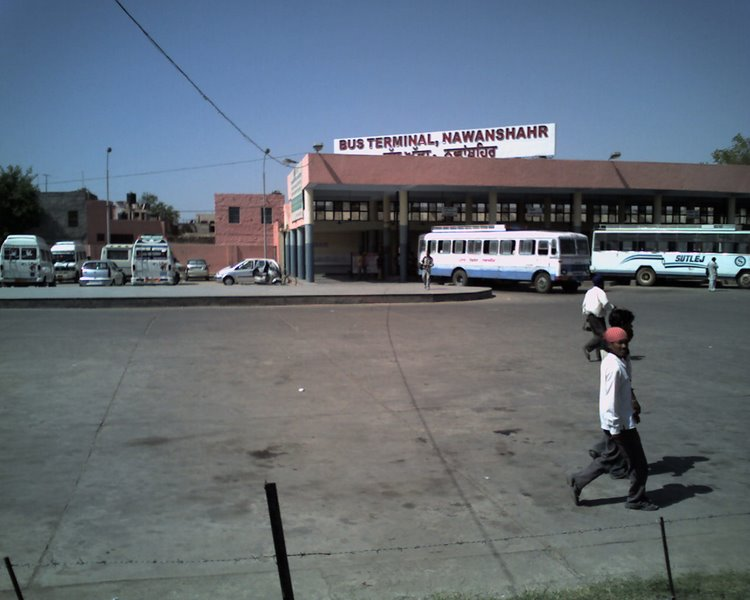
Nawashahr Bus Stand

Nawanshahr is well-connected by road to other parts of state. Punjab Roadways serve a number of routes from Nawanshahr to other big cities nearby, such as Amritsar, Delhi and Chandigarh.

== Healthcare ==
This region has abundant health facilities. A high number of private clinics and nursing homes are available and some claim to have the latest medical equipment. There is an adequate number of Government Hospitals, Dispensaries, and Primary Health Centers in this area. Some hospitals in Nawanshahr have a capacity of 64 beds and are equipped with the latest medical tools. Banga and Balachaur Hospitals have a capacity of 30 beds each. Also, Mukandpur, Urapar, Sujjon, Saroya, and Muzzaffarpur provide all kinds of health services. For every village in the district, health services are available. Veterinary hospitals can be found in Nawanshahr, Rahon, Saroya, and Balachaur and Behram also.

== Notable people from Nawanshahr ==
- Bhagat Singh – Indian freedom fighter
- Madan Puri — Hindi and Punjabi actor
- Jazzy B — Indian-Canadian singer
- Dev Diwana-Punjabi and Hindi Film Actor/writer and Director.
- Deep Saini — president and vice-chancellor of McGill University in Montreal
- Amrish Puri — actor
- Yash Chopra — Bollywood producer
- Sukh-E Musical Doctorz — singer-songwriter and producer
- Roshan Prince — singer

== See also ==
- Hansron
- Hussain Chak
- Langroya
- Gohlron
