= Unisa =

Unisa, UNISA, or UniSA may refer to:

== Universities ==
- University of Salerno, in Fisciano, Italy
- University of South Africa (UNISA or Unisa)
- University of South Australia (UniSA), now merged into Adelaide University

== Other uses ==
- Unisa Bangura (born 1987), Sierra Leonean footballer

== See also ==
- Unisan (disambiguation)
- U of SA (disambiguation)
