= Ucha =

Ucha may refer to:

== Places ==
- Ucha, Portugal, a parish near Barcelos
- Ucha (river), a tributary of the Klyazma in Russia
- Ucha, Kapurthala, a village in Punjab, India
- Ucha, Karnataka, a village in the Bidar district

== People ==
- Ucha Gogoladze, Georgian footballer
- Ucha Japaridze, Soviet Georgian painter
- Ucha Lobjanidze, Georgian footballer
- Gonzalo Ucha, Argentine footballer
- Julius Ucha, Nigerian politician

== Other uses ==
- UCHA, the University Cooperative Housing Association at the UCLA
- Ucha (Tokyo Mew Mew), a character in the manga series

== See also ==
- Ucha Pind, a village in Kapurthala district, Punjab, India
- Ceiriog Ucha, a community in Wales, United Kingdom
- Ladhana Ucha, a village in Punjab, India
- Usha (disambiguation)
