= USA (disambiguation) =

USA is an abbreviation and country code for the United States of America.

USA, usa, or Usa may also refer to:

== Arts and entertainment ==
=== Music ===
- USA (King Crimson album), 1975
- U.S.A. (Flatlinerz album), 1994
- [USA] (Anamanaguchi album), 2019
- U.S.A. (United State of Atlanta), a 2005 album by Ying Yang Twins
- USA (Unconformable Social Amputees), a 2006 album by Saint Dog
- "U.S.A. (Aiight Then)", a 2000 song by Mobb Deep
- "U.S.A." (Da Pump song), 2018
- "U.S.A.", a song by the Exploited from Troops of Tomorrow
- "U.S.A.", a song from the Bosnian band Dubioza kolektiv's 2011 album Wild Wild East.
- "USA", a song by Jeff Rosenstock from the 2018 album POST-
- The United States of America (band), a late 1960s American experimental rock band
  - The United States of America (album), 1968

=== Other uses in arts and entertainment ===
- U.S.A. (trilogy), three 1930s novels by John Dos Passos
- U.S.A. (painting), a painting by John Haberle
- USA: Land of Opportunities, a film series by Lars von Trier
- USA Network, an American cable television channel
- Ulster-Scots Agency, a body that promotes and conserves Ulster-Scots culture, language and history

== Businesses and organizations ==
=== Education ===
- Unionville-Sebewaing Area High School, United States
- University of Saint Anthony, Philippines
- University of San Agustin, Philippines
- University of South Alabama, United States
- University of South Asia (Pakistan)

=== Other businesses and organizations ===
- USA Funds, an American nonprofit organization
- United States Army, the land service branch of the United States Armed Forces
- United States Attorney, representing the federal government in United States district courts and courts of appeals
- Underground Service Alert, California, United States, an organization that coordinates the locating of underground utilities
- United Scenic Artists, an American labor union
- United Space Alliance, an American spaceflight company

== Places ==
=== Settlements ===
- Usa, Kōchi, Japan
- Usa, Ōita, Japan
  - Usa Station, a train station in Usa, Ōita
  - Usa District, Ōita, a former district
- Usa, Russia, the name of two rural localities
- Usa River, Meru District, Arusha, Tanzania

=== Rivers ===
- Usa (Germany), a right tributary of the Wetter in Germany
- Usa (Pechora), a right tributary of the Pechora in Russia
- Usa (Tom), a right tributary of the Tom in Russia
- Usa (Ufa), a right tributary of the Ufa in Russia

== Sports ==
- U-S-A!, a chant
- USA Perpignan, a French rugby union club
- United Soccer Association, a former soccer league in the United States and Canada
- United States at the Olympics (IOC code: USA)
- United States men's national soccer team (FIFA code: USA)

== Other uses ==
- USA (brand), a cigarette brand of Liggett Group
- US-A (Upravlyaemy Sputnik Aktivnyy), a Soviet nuclear-powered surveillance satellite
- Usa, a legendary patron of Egypt, according to the Midrash Abkir
- MV USA, formerly Empire Lad, a Panamanian tanker ship
- Uniform Securities Act, an American model statute for drafting state securities laws
- United Supermarkets Arena, an arena in the United States
- Usarufa language (ISO 639-3 code: usa)
- Concord Regional Airport (IATA code: USA)

== See also ==
- U of SA (disambiguation)
- Us (disambiguation)
- Usha (disambiguation), also transcribed as Uṣā
  - Uṣā, or Usha, a character in the ancient Indian epic Mahabharata
- USAA, an American financial company
- μSA, a United States micropolitan statistical area
- Union of South Africa, the 1910–1961 historical predecessor to the present-day Republic of South Africa
- United States of Africa, a hypothetical concept
- USA Freedom Act, a 2015 US surveillance law
- USA Today, an American national daily newspaper
