= Timeline of the COVID-19 pandemic in India (January–May 2020) =

Sequence of major events in ongoing COVID-19 viral pandemic in India

The following is the timeline of the COVID-19 pandemic in India from January 2020 to May 2020.

Timeline of the pandemic spread across India (30 January 2020 to 3 April 2020)

Cases

Deaths

== January ==
Major events of COVID-19 pandemic in India till February
27 January	First confirmed case
1 February	First airlift from Wuhan, China
27 February	Final airlift from Wuhan, China (Total of 759 Indians and 43 foreign nationals) airlift from Japan (119 Indians and 5 foreign nationals)

Timeline of COVID-19 Pandemic in India in January 2020
Date	Description	References
27 January 2020	The first case in India was confirmed in Kerala's Thrissur district in a student who had returned for a vacation from Wuhan University in China	

== February ==
- On 2 February, the second case was reported in Kerala's Alappuzha district in a student who had returned from Wuhan, China.
- On 3 February, the third case was reported in Kerala's Kasaragod district in a student who had returned from Wuhan, China.

== March ==
Major events of COVID-19 pandemic in India in March
6 March	International passenger screenings at airports
10 March	First airlift from Iran
11 March	First airlift from Italy
12 March	First confirmed death
13 March	Suspension of non-essential traveller visas
15 March	100 confirmed cases
16 March	Passenger land border crossing suspended
22 March	One day Janta Curfew; Passenger air travel suspended till further notice
22 March	Final airlift from Italy (Total of 564 Indians), India observed a 14-hour curfew
25 March	Nationwide lock-down imposed till 14 April
28 March	1,000 confirmed cases
29 March	Final airlift from Iran (Total of 764 Indians)
30 March	100 confirmed recoveries
31 March	Cluster identified: Delhi religious congregation event – Tablighi Jamaat

=== 1–2 March ===
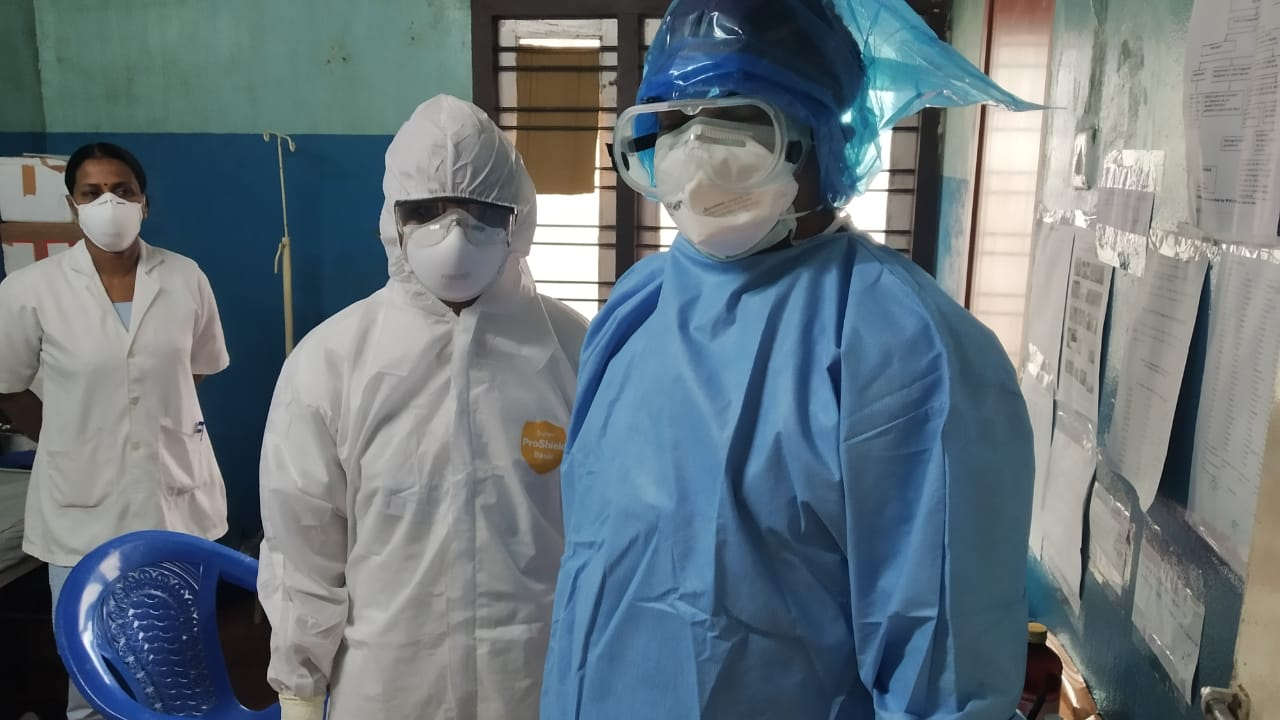
Healthcare workers wearing personal protective equipment for caregiving for a patient with coronavirus infection in a government hospital in Kerala.

- On 2 March, the Union Health Ministry reported two more cases: a 45-year-old man in Delhi who had travelled back from Italy and a 24-year-old engineer in Hyderabad who had a travel history with the United Arab Emirates. In addition, an Italian citizen in Jaipur, who was earlier tested negative, tested positive, totalling six confirmed cases in the country. 88 people who were in contact with the Hyderabad individual, including fellow bus passengers from Bangalore, were tracked down by the government and placed under watch. Officials of the Government of Telangana stated that 36 people who had been in contact with the Hyderabad engineer had developed coronavirus symptoms. An employee of Intel in Bangalore who had come in contact with him was quarantined. Fifteen crew members of the Air India flight, which had carried the Delhi man from Vienna, were placed in isolation for 14 days, while six of his family members in Agra were quarantined. Staff of a restaurant in Delhi where he had dined on 28 February were asked to self-quarantine for two weeks, and two schools in Noida whose students had attended a birthday party of his child were closed for a week.

=== 3–4 March ===
- On 3 March, the wife of the Italian tourist in Jaipur also tested positive, and her samples were sent to Pune for confirmation. A total of 24 people (21 Italians and 3 Indians) residing in a South Delhi hotel were shifted to an ITBP camp for testing.
- On 4 March, 15 of them (14 Italians and 1 Indian), along with the Jaipur Italian tourist's wife, tested positive for coronavirus, according to an announcement by the All India Institute of Medical Sciences, New Delhi; the 14 Italians were quarantined at Medanta in Gurgaon. The six family members of the Delhi case in Agra were confirmed to be infected with the virus. A Paytm Gurgaon employee from Delhi, who had returned from a vacation in Italy, tested positive, taking the number of cases to 29. 459 passengers have been screened in Kochi who were on board the Italian luxury cruise ship 'Costa Victoria'.

=== 5–6 March ===
- On 5 March, a middle-aged man in Ghaziabad who had travel history with Iran tested positive. More than 1,200 people, who came from other countries, were quarantined in Kolkata.
- On 6 March, a resident of West Delhi, who had travelled to Malaysia and Thailand, was diagnosed with the virus.

=== 7–8 March ===
- On 7 March, a man in Jammu, who had travelled to Iran and South Korea, and two people from Hoshiarpur with travel history to Italy were tested positive in preliminary tests, but a confirmation from Pune was awaited. The Union Health Ministry announced three confirmed cases on 7 March—two people from Ladakh who had visited Iran, and a person in Tamil Nadu who had been to Oman. The lone patient of COVID-19 in Tamil Nadu later tested negative on 10 March with that no fresh cases remained in the state. An American tourist who was tested positive in Bhutan, caused alert in Assam after he was found to have visited several places in the state before leaving the country.
- On 8 March, five people of the same family in Ranni, Pathanamthitta District, Kerala, were tested positive for the virus. Three of them had been to Italy while other two came in direct contact with those infected.

=== 9–10 March ===
- On 9 March, a three-year-old, who returned from Italy two days before, was tested positive in Ernakulam; the child's parents were also quarantined as a precaution. A 63-year-old woman in Jammu and Kashmir who had been to Iran was confirmed to be infected with the virus. A person in Agra, who had come in contact with an infected person, and a man in Delhi were diagnosed with the virus. Later, one of the two Hoshiarpur, Punjab suspected cases tested positive, as did a techie in Bangalore who had travel history to the United States. Maharashtra reported its first two cases later in the day after a couple in Pune, with travel history to Dubai, tested positive.
- On 10 March, a press release from the Indian Council of Medical Research confirmed that three more people in Karnataka, including wife and child of the infected Bangalore techie, were diagnosed with the virus. The Chief Minister of Kerala Pinarayi Vijayan reported six fresh cases in Pathanamthitta, all of whom were linked to the five previously confirmed cases from the town. Three more people in Pune, who had come in contact with the infected couple from the city, tested positive. Later, both parents of the infected three-year-old child in Ernakulam were also tested positive.

=== 11–12 March ===
- On 11 March, an 85-year-old man in Jaipur tested positive who had travel history to Dubai. Two people tested positive in Mumbai, who were close to previously reported Pune patients. Maharashtra Chief Minister Uddhav Thackeray confirmed while addressing a press conference that total 10 people have tested positive in the state which included 8 from Pune and 2 from Mumbai. Later, a 45-year-old man who returned from US tested positive in Nagpur, taking the toll to 11 in Maharashtra.
- On 12 March, a 76-year-old man from Kalaburgi, Karnataka who had a travel history to Saudi Arabia became the first victim of the virus in the country. A tourist guide in Noida, Uttar Pradesh who had come in contact with a group of Italian tourists, tested positive. Later, a Canadian woman tested positive in Lucknow, Uttar Pradesh. Her husband, who had travelled with her was also put in isolation. A 69-year-old woman in West Delhi who tested positive and died later, transmitted it from her 46-year-old son who had travel history to Japan, Italy and Geneva, Switzerland. Andhra Pradesh reported its first case, a man returned from Italy tested positive in Nellore. Five people with whom he came in contact were quarantined.

=== 13–14 March ===
- On 13 March, 69-year-old woman from Delhi, who had transmitted it from her 46-year-old son with the travel history to Japan, Italy and Switzerland, became the second victim of the virus in the country. An employee of Google in Bangalore, who had returned from a trip to Greece, tested positive; his colleagues were quarantined. Later, two more people in Kerala who had returned from Dubai and Qatar tested positive taking the total number of COVID-19 cases in the state to 16. In Maharashtra, 1 more person in Pune and 2 more in Nagpur tested positive taking total to 17 in the state. An employee of a private firm in Noida tested positive who had travelled to Italy and then Switzerland. An Indian national evacuated from Italy and quarantined at an Army facility near Gurugram tested positive. Seven patients – 5 from Uttar Pradesh, and one each from Rajasthan and Delhi survived the disease and got discharged from various hospitals.
- On 14 March, In Maharashtra two people in Yavatmal with travel history to Dubai, one each in Thane, Ahmednagar, Mumbai, Kalyan, Kamothe and Vashi, and five in Pimpri-Chinchwad tested positive. A second case of coronavirus was detected in Hyderabad in a person with a travel history to Italy. A 24-year-old man in Jaipur who had travel history to Spain tested positive.

=== 15–16 March ===
- On 15 March, A 59-year-old woman from Aurangabad with a travel history to Russia tested positive. Uttar Pradesh reported its 12th case in Lucknow. A UK national and a doctor who returned from abroad tested positive in Kerala. Telangana reported its third case in a person who had travelled to the Netherlands. A trainee officer at Forest Research Institute who had returned from a study tour to Spain, Finland and Russia became the first person to be tested positive in Uttarakhand. The daughter of the first victim of the virus in the country tested positive in Kalaburagi, Karnataka. The Italian couple and the Dubai-returned 85-year-old Jaipur native in Rajasthan recovered from the virus. A 31-year-old man from Pune who recently travelled to Dubai and Japan tested positive later in the day.
- On 16 March, Odisha reported its first case when a 31-year-old man from Bhubaneswar with travel history to Italy tested positive. Maharashtra reported four more cases – three in Mumbai and one in Navi Mumbai. A woman who was part of a nine-member group that returned from Dubai on 1 March tested positive in Yavatmal in Maharashtra. Kerala reported three more cases – two in Malappuram and one in Kasaragod. A 32-year-old man from Karnataka, who had returned in the same flight from Heathrow, London as the Mindtree employee, tested positive. A 34-year-old soldier of the Indian Army, whose father had contracted the virus on 6 March, tested positive in Leh.

=== 17–18 March ===
- On 17 March, a 64-year-old man from Mumbai, Maharashtra, who had a travel history to Dubai, became the third victim of the virus in the country. Two people who returned from France tested positive in Noida. Three more cases were reported in Ladakh – two from Leh and one from Kargil district. A 3-year-old girl and both her parents tested positive in Mumbai. In Puducherry, a 68-year-old woman who travelled to the UAE was the first reported case in the Union Territory. In Kalaburagi, Karnataka, a 63-year-old doctor, who treated the first victim of the virus in the country, tested positive. Two inmates at the ITBP quarantine facility in New Delhi, who had a travel history to Italy, tested positive. West Bengal reported its first case in a person who had returned from England.
- On 18 March, a woman in her late 20s, who had a travel history to France and the Netherlands, tested positive in Pune. Telangana reported its sixth case in a person who had a travel history to the UK. A man from Gautam Buddha Nagar district in Noida who had returned from Indonesia tested positive. Karnataka reported two more cases, a 56-year-old man who returned from the United States and a 26-year-old woman who returned from Spain. Tamil Nadu's second case was reported in a person who travelled by train from Delhi to Chennai. Rajasthan reported three more cases in a couple and their 2-year-old daughter from Jhunjhunu, they had returned from Italy.

=== 19–20 March ===
Indian Prime Minister Narendra Modi's televised address about Coronavirus on 19 March 2020

- On 19 March, a 72-year-old man in Punjab who had returned from Germany via Italy became the fourth victim of the virus in the country. A 23-year-old woman in Chandigarh who had a travel history to the UK tested positive. Two women from Mumbai – a 22-year-old who had returned from the UK and a 49-year-old resident of Ulhasnagar who had returned from Dubai tested positive. Chhattisgarh reported its first case in a 23-year-old woman from Raipur who had travelled to London, UK. Two more people tested positive in Uttar Pradesh – one from Lucknow and the other from Lakhimpur Kheri district. A person from Kodagu district in Karnataka tested positive. A 21-year-old student who had returned from Ireland tested positive in Tamil Nadu. An HCL employee in Noida, Uttar Pradesh who had returned from international travel tested positive.
- On 20 March, Bollywood singer Kanika Kapoor who returned from London tested positive in Lucknow. A 69-year-old Italian man who recovered from coronavirus earlier, died due to cardiac arrest in Rajasthan. Gujarat reported its first two cases, a woman in Surat who returned from New York City and a man in Rajkot who returned from Mecca tested positive. Telangana reported ten new cases, seven Indonesians, a 22-year-old man who had returned from Scotland, and two person who returned from London tested positive. Four more people tested positive in Lucknow, Uttar Pradesh – three related to a previously infected doctor and one with a travel history to Gulf. A third case was reported in Punjab's Mohali where a 68-year-old women who returned from United Kingdom tested positive. One more person tested positive in Kolkata, West Bengal, a 20-year-old man with a travel history to United Kingdom. An 18-year-old-girl in Telangana with a travel history to London tested positive. Three more cases were reported in Maharashtra – one each in Mumbai, Pune and Pimpri-Chinchwad. Himachal Pradesh reported its first two cases. Twelve more cases were reported in Kerala – five from Ernakulam, six from Kasaragod and one from Palakkad. In Bhilwara, Rajasthan, six people tested positive. A couple who returned from Spain, tested positive in Jaipur.

=== 21–22 March ===
- On 21 March, Noida confirmed a case in Supertech CapeTown society. West Bengal reported its third case in a woman with a travel history to Scotland. Number of coronavirus positive cases increases in Punjab to 13. Six new cases were reported in Rajasthan – five from Bhilwara and one from Jaipur. In Karnataka, three more positive cases were confirmed. Three more positive cases were confirmed in Tamil Nadu, all foreign nationals.
- On 22 March, a 63-year-old man from Mumbai, Maharashtra, a 38-year-old man from Patna, Bihar and a 64-year-old man from Surat, Gujarat became the fifth, sixth and seventh victims of the virus in the country. In Karnataka, a 33-year-old-man with recent foreign travel history tested positive. Ten more people tested positive in Maharashtra – six from Mumbai and four from Pune, five of whom got the infection through local transmission and the other five had a history of foreign travel. Seven more cases were confirmed in Punjab, all of whom had come in contact with the 70-year-old man from Pathlawa village who had succumbed to the virus in the previous week. Gujarat reported four more cases – two each from Ahmedabad and Gandhinagar. In Telangana, a 24-year-old man of Guntur district of Andhra Pradesh tested positive. 15 more people tested positive in Karnataka. Rajasthan reported three new cases – one each from Bhilwara, Jhunjhunu and Jodhpur.

=== 23–24 March ===
Modi's address about COVID-19 on 24 March 2020

- On 23 March, a 55-year-old man from Kolkata, West Bengal and a Tibetan refugee from Kangra district in Himachal Pradesh became the eighth and ninth victims of the virus in the country. A 68-year-old man from the Philippines died in Mumbai after initial recovery from the virus. Kerala reported 28 new cases – 19 from Kasaragod district, five from Kannur, one from Pathnamthitta, two from Ernakulam and one from Thrissur.
- On 24 March, a 65-year-old man from Mumbai, Maharashtra, who had a travel history to the UAE, became the tenth victim of the virus in the country. Two more cases were reported in Kozhikode, Kerala – a 42-year-old man who returned from Abu Dhabi and a 27-year-old person from Cherapuram. Manipur reported its first case in a woman who had returned from the UK. In Maharashtra, four more cases were reported – three from Pune and one from Satara. Three more cases were reported in Telangana – one each from Kokapet, Chanda Nagar and Begumpet. Six more people tested positive in Punjab, all of whom had come in contact with the 70-year-old Nawanshahr resident who had tested positive for the infection and died of cardiac arrest the previous week. Three more cases were reported in Chennai – a 74-year-old male and a 52-year-old female who had returned from the United States and a 25-year-old female who had returned from Switzerland. Mizoram reported its first case in a 50-year-old man with a travel history of Qatar, Amsterdam, Istanbul and Doha.

=== 25–26 March ===
- On 25 March, a 54-year-old man from Madurai in Tamil Nadu, a 65-year-old woman from Indore in Madhya Pradesh and an 85-year-old woman from Ahmedabad in Gujarat became the eleventh, twelfth and thirteenth victims of the virus in the country. A 29-year-old from Patna, Bihar, who had returned from Gujarat tested positive. Three more cases were reported in Gujarat – one each from Ahmedabad, Surat and Vadodara, of which one was related to travel history to Dubai and two were local transmissions. In Madhya Pradesh, a journalist, who had attended the final press conference of Congress leader Kamal Nath as the CM, tested positive. Five more cases were reported in Tamil Nadu – four Indonesians and their travel guide from Chennai. Six more cases were reported in Maharashtra – five from Mumbai and one from Thane. In Maharashtra, a 65-year-old woman who used to serve lunch near a corporate office in Mumbai's Prabhadevi tested positive.
- On 26 March, a 65-year-old man from Srinagar in Jammu and Kashmir, a 70-year-old man from Bhavnagar in Gujarat and a 75-year-old woman from Gauribidanur in Karnataka, a 65-year-old woman from Navi Mumbai in Maharashtra and a 73-year-old man from Bhilwara district in Rajasthan became the fourteenth, fifteenth, sixteenth, seventeenth and eighteenth victims of the virus in the country. Three more cases were reported in Goa – a 25-year-old man who returned from Spain, a 29-year-old man who returned from Australia and a 55-year-old man who returned from the US. Four more people tested positive in Lucknow, Uttar Pradesh – a 21-year-old woman whose parents had tested positive, a 32-year-old man who had returned from Dubai, a 33-year-old woman and a 39-year-old man. Five more people tested positive in Telangana – a 3-year-old kid who had returned from Saudi Arabia, a middle-aged lady who was the primary contact of another person who had tested positive, a 49-year-old man from Medchal, a 36-year-old lady doctor from Domalguda and her 41-year-old doctor husband. Five more cases were reported in Indore, Madhya Pradesh, none of which were linked to foreign travel history. Three more cases were reported in Noida, Uttar Pradesh, all related to each other – a 21-year-old woman whose parents had tested positive, 39-year-old man who was a co-worker of the 21-year-old woman's father and his 33-year-old wife. Andaman and Nicobar Islands reported its first case – a man who had returned from Chennai. Two more cases were confirmed in Maharashtra – one each from Mumbai and Thane. Three more cases were reported in Bihar – a 20-year-old man from Patna who had no travel history; a 40-year-old woman and a 12-year-old boy from Munger district who had come in contact with the 38-year-old man from the state who had succumbed to the virus. two more positive cases were reported in Andhra Pradesh.

=== 27–28 March ===
- On 27 March, a 65-year-old woman from Mumbai in Maharashtra, a 65-year-old man from Indore in Madhya Pradesh, a 60-year-old man from Tumakuru in Karnataka and a 38-year-old man from Ujjain in Madhya Pradesh became the nineteenth, twentieth, twenty-first and twenty-second victims of the virus in the country. Kerala confirmed thirty-nine more cases – thirty-three from Kasaragod district, two from Kannur and one each from Thrissur, Kozhikode and Kollam. Twenty-eight cases were reported in Maharashtra. Telangana confirmed fourteen more cases. Ten more cases were reported in Madhya Pradesh. Karnataka reported nine more cases. Odisha reported a case in a person who had returned to Bhubaneswar from Delhi. One more case was confirmed in Andaman and Nicobar Islands in a man in his mid-30s who had travelled with the first positive case in the Union Territory. Two more cases were reported in Bihar- a person from Siwan who had returned from Dubai and a person from Nalanda who had no travel history. In Andhra Pradesh, a man who had come in contact with an afflicted patient in Visakhapatnam tested positive. One more case was reported in Chandigarh in a person who had returned from Dubai. Five local transmissions were reported in Punjab – three from SBS Nagar and one each from Jalandhar and Sas nagar. Seven cases were reported in Rajasthan – two each from Bhilwara and Dungarpur, and one each from Jaipur, Jodhpur and Churu.
- On 28 March, a 60-year-old Yemeni national who had traveled to Delhi as a potential liver donor, a 69-year-old man from Ernakulam in Kerala who had returned from Dubai, an 85-year-old retired urologist from Mumbai in Maharashtra a 74-year-old man from Hyderabad in Telangana who had returned from a religious congregation in New Delhi, a 46-year-old from Ahmedabad in Gujarat and a 74-year-old man from Telangana became the twenty-third, twenty-fourth, twenty-fifth, twenty-sixth, twenty-seventh, twenty-eighth victims of the virus in the country. Fourteen more cases were registered in Maharashtra – twelve from Mumbai and two from Nagpur. Seventeen more cases were confirmed in Karnataka – sixteen linked to other cases and a man from Bengaluru who had returned from London, UK. Thirteen more cases were confirmed in Jammu and Kashmir – nine from Srinagar, three from Jammu and one from Ganderbal. Three more cases were confirmed in Madhya Pradesh – two from Indore and one from Ujjain. Four more cases were confirmed in Rajasthan – a 23-year-old man in Ajmer who had travelled to Punjab and three staff members of a private hospital in Bhilwara. Gujarat reported six more cases. Tamil Nadu reported two more cases – one from Kumbakonam and another from Katpadi. Kerala reported six more cases – two from Thiruvananthapuram district and one each from Kollam, Palakkad, Malappuram and Kasaragod. Five more cases were reported in Uttar Pradesh – three from Noida and one each from Greater Noida and Gautam Buddha Nagar district. Another case was reported in Uttarakhand in a 21-year-old man from Dehradun who had a travel history to Dubai. A 21-year-old man from Raipur in Chhattisgarh who had returned from London, UK tested positive. Six more cases were reported in Telangana. Three more people tested positive in Andaman and Nicobar Islands, all of whom had attended a religious programme in Delhi. Three women in West Bengal, two of whom had come in contact with another positive case, tested positive.

=== 29–30 March ===
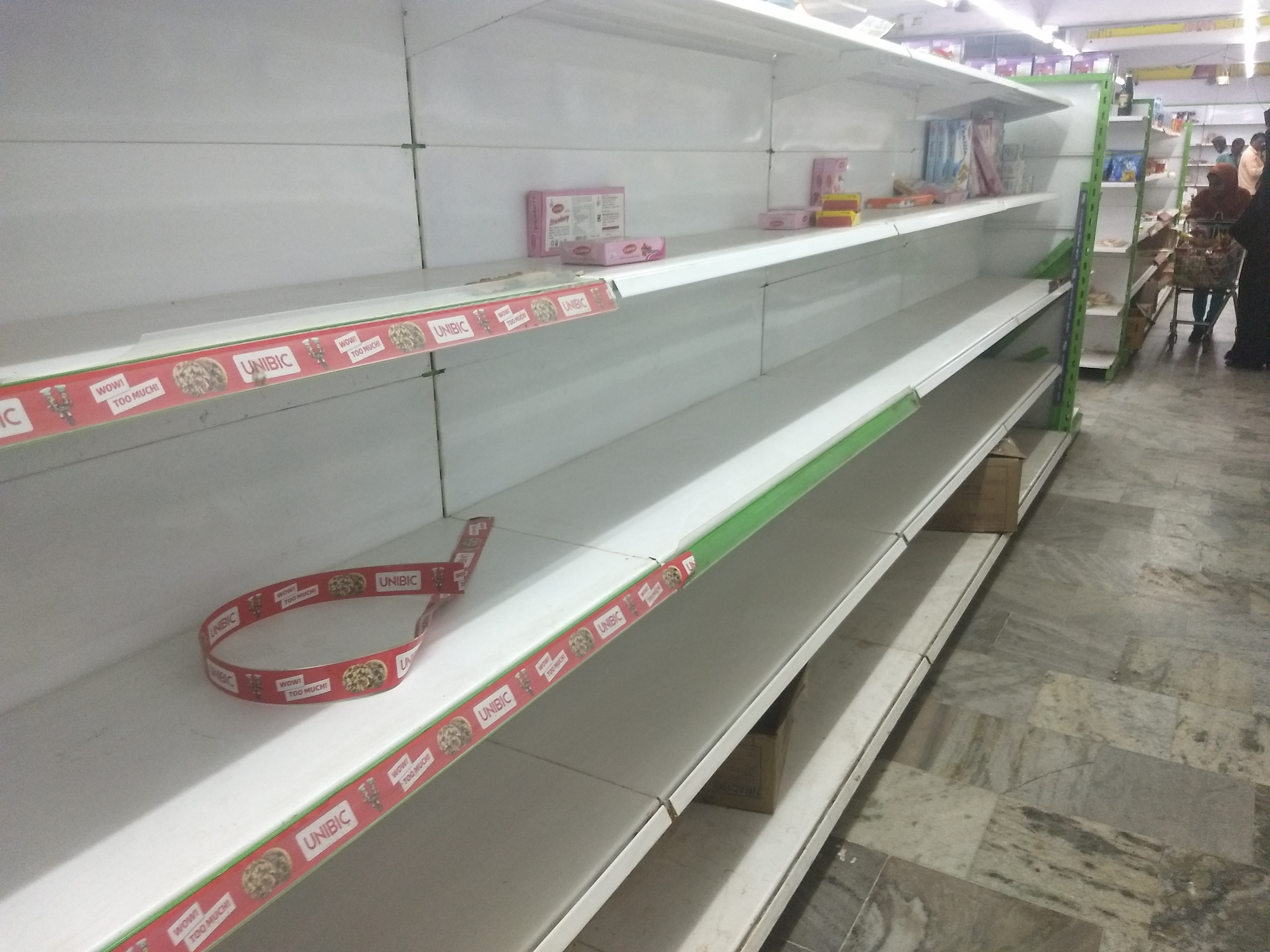
Empty store shelves in Tiruppur due to panic buying prior to lockdown

- On 29 March, a 45-year-old man from Ahmedabad in Gujarat, a 52-year-old man from Srinagar in Jammu and Kashmir, a 40-year-old woman from Mumbai in Maharashtra, a 45-year-old man from Buldhana in Maharashtra and a 62-year-old man from Hoshiarpur district in Punjab became twenty-ninth, thirtieth, thirty-first, thirty-second and thirty-third victims of the virus in the country. Twenty-three cases were registered in Delhi. Twenty-two more cases were confirmed in Maharashtra – ten from Mumbai, five from Pune, three from Nagpur, three from Ahmednagar and one each from Sangli, Buldhana and Jalgaon. Twenty more cases were reported in Kerala – eight from Kannur district, seven from Kasaragod and one each from Thiruvananthapuram, Ernakulam, Thrissur, Palakkad and Malappuram. Tamil Nadu reported eight more cases, all of which were linked to the two Thai nationals and their group who had tested positive. Gujarat registered eight more cases – four from Ahmedabad and one each from Rajkot, Surat, Porbandar and Gir Somnath. Jammu and Kashmir reported five more cases – two from Srinagar, two from Budgam and one from Baramulla. Four more cases were reported in Bihar. Five more cases were detected in Rajasthan – three from Ajmer and one each from Bhilwara and Jhunjhunu. First case reported positive in Ambala. Two people, one of whom was a brother of one of the other cases, tested positive in Goa. Two more local transmissions were reported in Visakhapatnam, Andhra Pradesh. Three more cases were reported in West Bengal – 51-year-old army anaesthesiologist from Kolkata who had returned from Delhi, a 66-year-old retired government employee from Baranagar and a 59-year-old man. Three more cases were reported in Telangana.
- On 30 March, a 45-year-old woman from Bhavnagar in Gujarat, a 44-year-old woman from Kalimpong in West Bengal, a 52-year-old man from Pune in Maharashtra, a 42-year-old woman from Ludhiana in Punjab, a 41-year-old man from Indore in Madhya Pradesh a 49-year-old woman from Indore in Madhya Pradesh, an 80-year-old man from Mumbai in Maharashtra, five persons from Telangana, a 25-year-old man from Basti district in Uttar Pradesh and a 48-year-old woman from Howrah in West Bengal became the thirty-fourth, thirty-fifth, thirty-sixth, thirty-seventh, thirty-eighth, thirty-ninth, fortieth, forty-first, forty-second, forty-third, forty-fourth, forty-fifty, forty-sixth and forty-seventh victims of the virus in the country. Thirty-two cases were detected in Kerala, of which seventeen were linked to foreign travel history and fifteen were local transmissions. A 49-year-old man from Kakinada and a 72-year-old man from Rajahmundry tested positive in Andhra Pradesh. Seventeen more cases were reported in Tamil Nadu. One more case was confirmed in Andaman and Nicobar Islands. Gujarat confirmed six more cases – five from Bhavnagar and one from Ahmedabad. Eight more cases were registered in Madhya Pradesh – seven from Indore and one from Ujjain. Punjab registered three more cases – one each from Mohali, Ludhiana and Patiala. Jammu and Kashmir reported eleven more cases – eight from Kashmir and three from Jammu division. Five more cases were confirmed in Chandigarh – an NRI couple who reside in Canada and three local transmissions. Seven more people tested positive in Telangana. Twenty-five more people tested positive in Delhi. Maharashtra registered seventeen more cases – eight from Mumbai, five from Pune, two from Nagpur and one each from Nashik and Kolhapur. Sixteen more cases were reported in Uttar Pradesh – seven from Noida, six from Meerut and one each from Lucknow, Agra and Bulandshahr. Twenty cases were detected in Rajasthan. Three members of a family who returned from Italy and their two close relatives were discharged.

=== 31 March ===
- On 31 March, a 68-year-old woman from Thiruvananthapuram in Kerala and a 65-year-old man from Mohali district in Punjab became the forty-eighth and forty-ninth victims of the virus in the country. The senior citizen couple in Kerala was discharged. Sixty-four more cases were reported in Maharashtra. Fifty-seven more people tested in Tamil Nadu. The case count in Delhi went up by twenty-three. Another twenty-one persons tested positive in Andhra Pradesh. Nineteen more cases were reported in Madhya Pradesh – seventeen from Indore and one each from Bhopal and Ujjain. Three local transmissions were detected in Gujarat – one each from Ahmedabad, Gandhinagar and Rajkot. Karnataka reported seven more cases – two from Bengaluru, two from Mysuru and one each from Chikkaballapur, Dakshina Kannada and Uttarakannada. Six cases were reported in Kashmir. Five local transmissions were reported in Bareilly, Uttar Pradesh. Four more cases were reported in Rajasthan. First positive case reported in Jharkhand.

== April ==
Major events of COVID-19 pandemic in India in April
5 April	100 confirmed deaths
14 April	10,000 confirmed cases Nationwide lock-down extended till 3 May
13 April	1,000 confirmed recoveries
19 April	500 confirmed deaths
22 April	20,000 confirmed cases
25 April	5,000 confirmed recoveries
29 April	30,000 confirmed cases
29 April	1,000 confirmed deaths

=== 1–2 April ===
- On 1 April, a 65-year-old man from Khargone district in Madhya Pradesh, a 72-year-old from Meerut in Uttar Pradesh a 51-year-old man from Mumbai in Maharashtra, a 50-year-old man from Palghar in Maharashtra, a 75-year-old man from Mumbai in Maharashtra, an 84-year-old woman from Mumbai in Maharashtra, a 73-year-old woman from Mumbai in Maharashtra and a 63-year-old woman from Mumbai in Maharashtra became the fiftieth, fifty-first, fifty-second, fifty-third, fifty-fourth, fifty-fifty, fifty-sixth and fifty-seventh victims of the virus in the country. One hundred and ten people tested positive in Tamil Nadu. Forty-three more cases were reported in Andhra Pradesh. Maharashtra reported thirty-three more cases – thirty from Mumbai, two from Pune and one from Buldhana. Confirmed cases in Delhi increased by thirty-two. Kerala reported twenty-four more cases – twelve from Kasargod, three from Ernakulam, two each from Thiruvananthapuram, Thrissur, Malappuram and Kannur, and one from Palakkad. Twenty more infections were detected in Madhya Pradesh – nineteen from Indore and one from Khargone district. Sixteen positive cases were confirmed in Maharashtra. Eight more people tested positive cases in Ahmedabad, Gujarat, of whom four had inter-state travel history, three contracted it from locals and one had foreign travel history. Four positive cases were confirmed in Guwahati, Assam. Thirteen more cases were registered in Ramganj area of Jaipur in Rajasthan, all of whom had come in contact with the first positive case in the area.
- On 2 April, two persons who had visited the Nizamuddin Markaz in Delhi, a 52-year-old man from Vadodara in Gujarat, a 55-year-old man from Vijayawada in Andhra Pradesh, a 62-year-old man from Amritsar in Punjab, four persons from Maharashtra, a 67-year-old man from Ambala in Haryana, a 65-year-old woman from Indore in Madhya Pradesh, a 54-year-old man from Indore in Madhya Pradesh and a 71-year-old man from Chennai in Tamil Nadu became the fifty-eighth, fifty-ninth, sixtieth, sixty-first, sixty-second, sixty-third, sixty-fourth, sixty-fifth, sixty-sixth, sixty-seventh, sixty-eighth, sixty-ninth and seventieth victims of the virus in the country. Delhi recorded an increase of one hundred and forty-one in confirmed cases, 91.49 percent of which were linked to the Nizamuddin Markaz congregation. Eighty-eight more infections were identified in Maharashtra – fifty-four from Mumbai, eleven from Pune, nine from Ahmednagar, nine from areas around Mumbai, two from Aurangabad and one each from Satara, Osmanabad and Buldhana. Tamil Nadu reported seventy-five more case of which seventy-four were linked to the Nizamuddin Markaz congregation. Three cases were confirmed in Assam's Goalpara district. Thirteen persons tested positive in Rajasthan – seven from Ramganj and one each from Jodhpur, Jhunjhunu, Udaipur, Dholpur & Bharatpur. Twenty cases were reported in Andhra Pradesh. A 10-month-old girl and her grandmother tested positive in Chandigarh. Arunachal Pradesh reported its first case in a 31-year-old man who returned from the Nizamuddin Markaz meet. Three persons who attended the Nizamuddin Markaz congregation tested positive in Una, Himachal Pradesh.

=== 3–4 April ===
- On 3 April, a 78-year-old man from Panchmahal district in Gujarat, a 67-year-old man from Ahmedabad in Gujarat, a 75-year-old man from Bagalkote in Karnataka, two persons in Delhi and a 71-year-old man from Chennai in Tamil Nadu became the seventy-first, seventy-second, seventy-third, seventy-fourth and seventy-fifth victims of the virus in the country. One hundred and two people tested positive in Tamil Nadu. Delhi registered ninety-three more cases, seventy-seven of which were connected to the Tablighi Jamaat congregation. Seventy-five more cases were confirmed in Telangana. Maharashtra reported sixty-seven more cases – forty-three from Mumbai, ten from areas around the city, nine from Pune, three from Ahmednagar and one each from Vashi and Ratnagiri. Madhya Pradesh's case count went up by forty-seven. Forty-six more cases were recorded in Rajasthan – fourteen from Jaipur, nine evacuees from Iran, twelve from Tonk, three each from Alwar and Udaipur, two each from Bharatpur and Bikaner and one from Dausa. Uttar Pradesh reported forty-four more cases, out of which forty-two were linked to the Nizamuddin Markaz event. Twelve more cases were reported in Andhra Pradesh. Nine positive cases were reported in kerala – 7 from Kasaragod and 1 each from Kannur & Thrissur.
- On 4 April, a 67-year-old woman from Ahmedabad in Gujarat, a 51-year-old man from Villupuram in Tamil Nadu, a 53-year-old woman from Theni district in Tamil Nadu, six persons in Maharashtra and 36-year-old man from Chhindwara in Madhya Pradesh became the seventy-sixth, seventy-seventh, seventy-eighth, seventy-ninth, eightieth, eighty-first, eighty-second, eighty-third, eighty-fourth and eighty-fifth victims of the virus in the country. Four positive cases were reported in Visakhapatnam. 47 positive cases were reported in Maharashtra. First case reported in Faridkot District where a 35-year-old man tested positive. One positive cases was reported in Assam. Six positive cases were reported in Uttarakhand.

=== 5–6 April ===
- On 5 April, a person from Delhi, a 61-year-old woman from Surat in Gujarat, thirteen people from Maharashtra, a 69-year-old woman from Ludhiana in Punjab, and a 60-year-old man from Chennai in Tamil Nadu became the 86th-102nd victims of the virus in the country. 113 cases were registered in Maharashtra – 81 from Mumbai, 18 from Pune, 4 from Aurangabad, 3 from Ahmednagar, 2 each from Kalyan-Dombivli and Thane, one each from Osmanabad and Vasai and one from Gujarat. 86 more people tested positive in Tamil Nadu, of whom 85 had attended the Tablighi Jamaat congregation and one had a travel history to Dubai. Delhi's case count rose by 58. Telangana detected 62 more infections. Positive cases were reported in Mewat – Haryana. 16 positive cases were reported in Indore – Madhya Pradesh. 29 positive cases were confirmed in Maharashtra. 42 years old man tested positive in Dera Bassi of Mohali and 28 years old man tested positive in Ludhiana.
- On 6 April, two people from Andhra Pradesh and a 62-year-old woman from Vadodara in Gujarat became the 103rd to 105th victims of the virus in the country. 120 cases were reported in Maharashtra – sixty-eight from Mumbai, forty-one from Pune, three from Aurangabad, two each from Vasai-Virar, Satara and Ahmednagar and one each from Jalna and Nashik. Sixty-three more people in Madhya Pradesh tested positive – forty-three from Bhopal, sixteen from Indore, one each from Betul, Vidisha, Ujjain and one from another district. Fourteen more positive cases reported in Andhra Pradesh – 5 in Visakhapatnam, 3 in Anantapuram, 3 in Kurnool, 2 in Guntur, & 1 in West Godavari. 16 positive cases were reported in Mohali. 7 positive cases were reported in Punjab – 2 from Fatehgarh Sahib, 2 from Ropar, 1 and first from Kapurthala, 1 new from Mohali and 1 from Amritsar. The person from Amritsar died on same day. 54 years old man tested the virus positive in Ludhiana.

=== 7–8 April ===
- On 7 April, the nationwide death toll hit one hundred and twenty-four. 23 positive cases were reported in Maharashtra. 12 positive cases were reported in Karnataka. Three positive cases were reported in Rajasthan. 12 more cases confirmed in the state as 7 from Mohali and all belongs to a single village, 2 from Mansa, 1 from Pathankot, the husband of the deceased corona patient, first Coronavirus case from Moga originally belongs to Maharashtra state and 1 from Amritsar, the wife of corona patient who died a day before in Amritsar. Later on 8 more cases confirmed in Punjab. 5 from Pathankot and all came into the contact of the deceased corona patient in the District and 3 from Moga.
- On 8 April, the Union Health Ministry put the death toll at one hundred and forty-nine. 22 cases were reported in Madhya Pradesh. 51 positive cases were confirmed in Delhi. Six positive cases were reported in Karnataka. 15 positive cases were reported in Rajasthan. 14 positive cases were reported in Jammu and Kashmir. Seven positive cases were reported in Punjab.

=== 9–10 April ===
- On 9 April, the death toll in the country rose to one hundred and sixty-nine. Maharashtra reported two hundred and eleven cases. Ninety-six people tested positive in Tamil Nadu. Seventy-six people in Gujarat tested positive for the virus. Delhi saw an increase of fifty-one new cases. One positive case was reported in Himachal Pradesh. 22 positive cases including a doctor & his wife have been tested positive in Madhya Pradesh. 51-year-old woman in Dhenkanal and a 69-year-old man from West Bengal in Bhubaneswar were confirmed positive. 7 positive case reported in Mohali. Four more cases confirmed in Piunjab – 3 from Jalandhar and 1 from Amritsar.
- On 10 April, four positive cases were reported in Odisha. 26 positive cases were reported in Rajasthan. 21 positive cases were confirmed in Gujarat. Two positive cases were reported in Bihar. 10 positive cases were reported in Karnataka. Eight positive cases were reported in Srinagar.

=== 11–12 April ===
- On 11 April, 16-year-old tested positive in Chhattisgarh earlier, has recovered and will be discharged. Two positive cases were reported in Odisha take the state tally to 50. 92 positive cases were reported in Maharashtra. Seven cases were reported in Karnataka. 54 cases were reported in Gujarat. 117 positive cases were reported in Rajasthan. 2 positive cases were reported in Himachal Pradesh. One positive case reported in Patiala District. Later on 2 new cases confirmed in Mohali. 1 more case confirmed in Pathankot and 3 from Jalandhar. 62 positive cases were reported in Madhya Pradesh.
- On 12 April, 51 cases were reported in Rajasthan. 54 cases were reported in Odisha. 15 cases reported from Dharavi in Mumbai. 25 positive cases were reported in Gujarat. 36 people have recovered in a single day in Kerala. 217 positive cases were reported in Mumbai. 21 positive cases were reported in Jammu and Kashmir. 2 more cases confirmed from Jawaharpur village of Mohali where an 80 years old and 55 years old females tested positive. 70-year-old woman has been discharged in Karnataka from hospital after treatment. At the same time, seven patients have been discharged after treatment so far.

=== 13–14 April ===
- On 13 April, 11 positive cases reported in Rajasthan – 10 from Bharatpur & 1 from Banswara. 30 positive cases were reported in Agra. 22 positive cases were reported in Gujarat. Four positive cases were reported from Dharavi in Mumbai. 52-year-old Gazetted Officer reported positive of Punjab Police in Ludhiana. The 44 Indians from Iran, who were brought to the country and kept in the Indian Navy's Quarantine Center at Ghatkopar, Mumbai, have now returned home. 6 positive cases were reported in Punjab – 1 case from Mohali and 2 cases reported each from Jalandhar and Pathankot 25 staff members of a hospital in Mumbai have tested positive. 25 cases reported in Kashmir.
- On 14 April, 29 deaths has been reported. A 56-year-old woman and a 38-year-old woman have tested positive in Mohali. 45 cases were reported in Gujarat. 34 positive cases were reported in Andhra Pradesh. Two cases were reported in Haryana. 8 positive cases were reported in Kerala. 204 positive cases were reported in Mumbai. 71 positive cases were reported in Rajasthan. First corona case confirmed in Gurdaspur District where a 60 years old man tested positive who returned from Jalandhar hospital.

=== 15–16 April ===
- On 15 April, the number of positive cases in India exceeded 11,000. 39 deaths has been reported. 76 positive cases were reported in Indore. Five positive cases were reported in Dharavi – Mumbai. 56 positive cases were reported in Gujrat. 29 cases reported in Rajasthan. 19 positive cases were reported in Andhra Pradesh. 183 positive cases were reported in Mumbai. only one positive case was reported in Kerala. 15 case were reported in Karnataka. 38 cases reported in Tamil Nadu, Of these, 34 are people who joined the Tablighi Jamaat and were in contact with them.
- On 16 April, 28 deaths has been reported. 19 positive cases were reported in Agra. 22 positive cases were reported in Andhra Pradesh. 2 positive cases were reported in Bihar. 15 cases were reported in Tamil Nadu. 34 cases were reported in Karnataka. 107 cases were reported in Mumbai. 7 cases were reported in Kerala. 2 cases were reported in Assam. 6 cases confirmed from Jalandhar District in Punjab.

=== 17–18 April ===
- On 17 April, 32 deaths has been reported. 38 cases were reported in Rajasthan – Jaipur-5, Jodhpur-18, Jhunjhunu-1, Nagaur-2, Ajmer-1, Tonk-6, Jhalawar-1, Kota-4. 5 positive cases reported from Srikalahasti Temple town of Chittoor District in Andhra Pradesh. 92 positive cases were reported in Gujarat. 38 cases were reported in Karnataka. 288 cases were reported in Maharashtra. 66 cases were reported in Telangana. Two cases reported from Ludhiana District and first case reported from Ferozepur District all came into contact with the Assistant Commissioner of Police Four cases confirmed in Jalandhar. State officer who tested corona positive a day before in Ludhiana, died. 56 positive cases were reported in Tamil Nadu. 15 positive cases were reported in Dharavi.
- On 18 April, According to Ministry of Health and Family Welfare Out of a total of 14378 cases, 4291 (29.8%) cases are affected by Nizamuddin Markaz cluster. 84 percent in Tamil Nadu, 63 percent in Delhi, 79 percent in Telangana, 59 percent in Uttar Pradesh and 61 percent in Andhra Pradesh are related to this incident & 1992 patients have been cured until the date, which is overall cure 13.85% of the total patients. 98 cases were reported in Rajasthan. 12 positive cases were reported in Karnataka. 49 cases were reported in Tamil Nadu. 2 cases were reported in Uttarakhand. In Ludhiana another state official, an Assistant sub-inspector of police tested corona positive.

=== 19 April ===
31 deaths has been reported.

- Jharkhand: One person reported positive in Dhanbad, taking the tally in Dhanbad to 2.
- Uttar Pradesh: 45 positive cases were reported in Agra, taking the tally in an Agra to 241.
- Maharashtra: 9 cases were reported in Nagpur. taking the tally in a city to 72.
- Bihar: one positive case was reported in Bihar, taking the tally to 87 in a state.
- Karnataka: 4 cases were reported in the Mysuru. Out of the 4 patients, 2 patients have travel history to Delhi. taking the telly in the state to 388.
- Rajasthan: 80 positive cases reported -17 in Bharatpur, 1 in Bhilwara, 2 in Bikaner, 7 in Jaipur, 1 in Jaisalmer, 1 in Jhunjhunu, 30 in Jodhpur, 12 in Nagour, 2 in Kota 2 in Jhalawar, 1 in Hanumangarh & 1 in Sawai Madhopur. Taking the tally in a state to 1431.
- Punjabː 4 cases were reported in Mohali.

=== 20 April ===
40 deaths and 1,540 new cases were reported.

After Goa, Manipur has also defeated the coronavirus. Two people were infected with the coronavirus there, but now both have recovered and returned home. Manipur has become a COVID-19 free state.

- Maharastra: Three cases were reported in Nagpur. Taking the tally in Nagpur to 76. In a same day new 466 cases reported in Maharashtra, taking the total telly in a state to 4666.
- Karnataka: 5 cases were reported in Karnataka. Taking the tally in a state to 395.
- Jammu & Kashmir: 14 cases were reported in Jammu and Kashmir. Taking the telly in the state to 368.
- Andhra Pradesh: 75 cases were reported in state, taking the total tally in a state to 722.
- Punjab: One case confirmed from Jalandhar.

=== 21 April ===
44 deaths has been reported.

Madhya Pradesh: 18 cases taking the total tally in a state to 915.

Uttar Pradesh: 28 cases were reported in Agra. Taking the total tally in Agra to 295. 31 cases were reported in Raebareli.

West Bengalː 29 cases were reported, taking the total tally in a state to 274.

Maharashtraː 12 cases were reported in Dharavi, taking the total tally in dharavi to 179.

Punjabː One new case confirmed from Mohali where a 25 years old boy tested corona positive and 5 corona positive cases confirmed in Patiala and all came into contact with the corona positive patient.

=== 22 April ===
49 deaths has been reported.

India stops rapid tests over faulty Chinese testing kits.

Rajasthan: 64 cases were reported in Rajasthan, taking the total tally in a state to 1799.

Uttar Pradesh: Six cases were reported in Meerut. 2 cases were reported in Kanpur. 26 cases were reported in Saharanpur.

Maharashtraː Nine cases were reported in Mumbai from Dharavi.

Tamil Naduː 33 cases were reported in a state.

Keralaː 11 cases were reported in a state.

Jammu and Kashmirː 27 cases were reported in a state.

=== 23 April ===
34 deaths & 1299 new cases has been reported.

Rajasthan: 47 positive cases have been reported in Rajasthan – 20 in Jodhpur, 12 in Jaipur, 10 in Nagaur, 2 each in Hanumangarh & Kota, 1 in Ajmer.

Andhra Pradesh: 80 cases were reported in a state.

Uttar Pradesh: 13 cases were reported in Saharanpur. 2 cases were reported in Kanpur, taking the total tally in Kanpur to 79.

Maharashtraː 25 cases were reported in Mumbai from Dharavi.

=== 24 April ===
37 deaths & 1752 cases reported.

Rajasthan: 70 new cases were reported, taking total cases in the state to 2,034.

Maharastra: 6 cases were reported from Dharavi in Mumbai.

Uttarakhandː 1 case was reported in a state.

Punjabː A 35 years old lady tested corona positive in Ludhiana and one new case in Jalandhar. Later on 6 cases confirmed from Patiala, 2 from Mansa and 1 from Amritsar.

Tamil Nadu: 72 new cases were reported, of which 52 belonged to Chennai.

=== 25 April ===
56 deaths & 1490 cases were reported.

Bihar: 2 cases were reported in Bihar.

Maharashtra: 21 cases were reported from Dharavi in Mumbai. 96 police personnel reported positive in a state.

Karnataka: 26 cases were reported in a state.

Jharkhand: 4 cases were reported positive in Ranchi.

Punjabː A lady doctor tested corona positive in Pathankot. Six more cases confirmed in Rajpura of Patiala District and all came into contact with corona positive patients. Near about after one month a new COVID-19 case reported in Nawanshahr where a 35 years old man tested corona positive who returned from Jammu. 18th death reported in Punjab from Jalandhar district where a 48 years old man died at morning and later on tested positive.

Rajasthan: 49 cases and 2 deaths were reported.

=== 26 April ===
47 deaths & 1975 cases were reported. New cases were reported in the states/UTs as following:

Madhya Pradesh: 91 cases were reported in Indore.

Bihar: 15 cases

Uttar Pradesh: 13 cases were reported in Saharanpur.

Haryana; 9 cases

Maharashtraː 440 cases

Punjabː 9 positive cases confirmed in Jalandhar.

Tamil Naduː 64 positive cases confirmed in the state.

Rajasthan: 102 cases confirmed in the state.

=== 27 April ===
60 deaths & 1463 cases were reported. New cases were reported in the states/UTs as following:

Jharkhand: First cases were reported in Jamtara city. Taking the total tally in the state to 83. 7 cases were reported in Ranchi.

Maharashtraː 13 cases were reported from Dharavi in Mumbai.

Chandigarhː 4 cases.

Tamil Naduː 52 cases

Rajasthan: 77 cases

=== 28 April ===
51 deaths & 1594 cases were reported. New cases were reported in the states/UTs as following:

Andhra Pradesh: 82 cases

Madhya Pradesh: 19 cases were reported in Indore.

Gujratː 226 cases

Maharashtraː 42 cases were reported from Dharavi.

Punjabː 2 cases were reported in Mohali.

Tamil Nadu: 121 cases were reported of which, 103 were from Chennai.

Uttarakhandː only 1 case was reported in Dehradun.

Jammu and Kashmirː 23 cases

Rajasthan: 102 cases were reported the state.

=== 29 April ===
71 deaths & 1813 cases were reported. New cases were reported in the states/UTs as following:

Chandigarhː 12 cases.

Odishaː 7 cases

Biharː 9 cases

Keralaː 10 cases

Jharkhandː 106 cases

West Bengalː 33 cases were reported in state.

Punjabː 2 cases confirmed in Faridkot who returned from Nanded, Maharashtra. 11 cases confirmed in Ludhiana, out of these 7 returned from Nanded and 4 returned from Kota University in Rajasthan and 3 cases confirmed in Hoshiarpur 2 new cases reported in Mohali.

Rajasthanː 74 cases

Tamil Nadu: 104 cases

=== 30 April ===
67 deaths & 1823 cases were reported. New cases were reported in the states/UTs as following:

Haryana: 18 cases

Andhra Pradesh: 71 cases

Maharashtra: 25 cases were reported from Dharavi.

Punjab: 105 cases

Chandigarhː 5 cases.

Tamil Naduː 161 cases

Odishaː 14 cases

Rajasthan: 146 cases

== May ==
Major events of COVID-19 pandemic in India in May
1 May	Nationwide lock-down further extended till 17 May
2 May	10,000 confirmed recoveries
7 May	50,000 confirmed cases
10 May	2,000 confirmed deaths
11 May	20,000 confirmed recoveries
17 May	Nationwide lockdown further extended till 31 May
19 May	100,000 confirmed cases
23 May	50,000 confirmed recoveries
27 May	150,000 confirmed cases
31 May	5,000 confirmed deaths

=== 1 May ===
77 deaths & 1755 cases were reported. New cases were reported in the states/UTs as following:

The Government of India extended nationwide lockdown further by two weeks until 17 May. New cases reported in following states/UTs were as:

Karnataka: 11 cases

Odisha: 1 case was reported in the state.

Maharashtra: 583 cases

jharkhandː 4 cases

Telanganaː 22 cases

Rajasthanː 82 cases

Gujaratː 313 cases

=== 2 May ===
77 deaths & 2411 cases were reported. New cases were reported in the states/UTs as following:

Andhra Pradesh: 62 cases

Punjab: 195 cases 2 cases reported in Mohali.

Maharashtra: 11 cases were reported in Nagpur. 790 cases were reported in a state

Haryana: 47 cases

Odisha: 2 cases

Tamil Nadu: 231 cases

Rajasthan: 106 new cases

=== 3 May ===
83 deaths & 2487 cases were reported. New cases were reported in the states/UTs as following:

Andhra Pradesh: 58 cases

Punjabː 331 cases

Jammu and Kashmirː 35 cases

Karnatakaː 3 cases

Uttarakhandː only 1 case was reported in the state.

Odishaː 2 cases

Rajasthan: 114 cases

=== 4 May ===
83 deaths & 2573 cases were reported.

Andhra Pradesh: 67 cases

Haryanaː 75 cases

Punjabː 132 cases

Tamil Naduː 527 cases

Chandigarhː 5 cases.

Biharː 6 cases

Rajasthan: 175 cases

=== 5 May ===
194 deaths & 3875 cases were reported. New cases were reported in the states/UTs as following:

Tripura: 13 border security force personnel tested positive in the state.

Karnataka: 8 cases

Chandigarhː 13 cases.

Jharkhandː 4 cases

Punjabː 219 cases

Rajasthanː 97 cases

=== 6 May ===
111 deaths & 2680 cases were reported. New cases were reported in the states/UTs as following:

Telangana: Telangana government announced for extension of lockdown until 29 May in the state.

Odisha: 1 case was reported in the state.

West Bengal: 122 cases

Maharashtra: 1233 cases& 68 cases were reported from Dharavi in Mumbai.

Karnataka: 20 cases

Jammu and Kashmirː 34 cases

Tamil Naduː 771 cases

Rajasthan: 159 cases 30 BSF soldiers tested positive who returned from Delhi after COVID-19 management duty.

=== 7 May ===
89 deaths & 3561 cases were reported. The tally of total cases in country crosses 50,000-mark. New cases were reported in the states/UTs as following:

Andhra Pradesh: 56 cases

Karnataka: 8 cases

Jharkhandː 5 cases

Haryanaː 31 cases

Tamil Naduː 580 cases

Karnatakaː 12 cases

Maharashtraː 1,216 cases in the state & 250 policeman cases were reported in a Mumbai city & tally of total cases in Mumbai crosses 10,000-mark till.

West Bengal: 92 cases

Rajasthan: 110 cases

=== 8 May ===
103 deaths & 3390 cases were reported. New cases were reported in the states/UTs as following:

Odisha: 26 cases

Andhra Pradesh: 54 cases

Tamil Nadu: 600 cases

Jammu and Kashmirː 30 cases

Punjab: 87 cases

Chandigarhː 146 cases.

Uttarakhandː 2 cases

West Bengal: 130 cases

Rajasthan: 152 cases

=== 9 May ===
95 deaths & 3320 cases were reported. New cases were reported in the states/UTs as following:

Uttarakhand: 4 cases

Andhra Pradesh: 43 cases

Chandigarhː 23 cases.

Punjabː 31 cases

Maharashtraˑ 25 cases were reported from Dharavi in Mumbai.

Karnataka: 41 cases

Gujarat: 394 cases

Tamil Nadu: 526 cases

Rajasthan: 129 cases

=== 10 May ===
128 deaths & 3277 cases were reported. New cases were reported in the states/UTs as following:

Haryana: 20 cases

Karnataka: 53 cases

Tamil Nadu: 669 cases

Maharashtraː 26 cases were reported from Dharavi in Mumbai.

Odishaː 23 cases

Delhiː 224 cases

Andhra Pradeshː 43 cases

Uttar Pradeshː 84 cases

Rajasthan: 106 cases

=== 11 May ===
97 deaths & 4213 cases were reported.

The total of 20,000 recoveries reported until 11 may. New cases were reported in the states/UTs as following:

Bihar: 11 cases

Karnataka: 14 cases

Punjab: 54 cases

Jammu and Kashmir: 18 cases

Delhi: 310 cases.

Andhra Pradesh: 38 cases

Rajasthan: 174 cases

=== 12 May ===
87 deaths & 3604 cases were reported. New cases were reported in the states/UTs as following:

Andhra Pradesh: 33 cases

Himachal Pradesh: 4 cases

Tamil Nadu: 716 cases

Jammu and Kashmir: 55 cases

Punjabː 37 cases

West Bengalː 37 cases

Maharashtraː 46 cases were reported from Dharavi in Mumbai.

Biharː 34 cases

Delhiː 406 cases

Rajasthan: 138 cases

=== 13 May ===
122 deaths & 3525 cases were reported. New cases were reported in the states/UTs as following:

Chandigarh: 2 cases.

Karnataka: 26 cases

Maharashtraː 1495 cases & 46 cases were reported from Dharavi in Mumbai.

Andhra Pradesh: 48 cases

Punjab: 37 cases

Tamil Nadu: 509 cases

Bihar: 84 cases

Jammu and Kashmir: 37 cases

Gujarat: 364 cases

Rajasthan: 202 cases

=== 14 May ===
134 deaths & 3722 cases were reported. New cases were reported in the states/UTs as following:

Uttarakhand:3 cases

Delhi: 472 cases

Andhra Pradesh: 68 cases

Karnataka: 22 cases

Maharashtraː In total of 1602 cases, out of which 1001 policeman reported positive in a state.

Punjabː 11 cases

Jammu and Kashmir: 12 cases

Tamil Nadu: 447 cases

West Bengal: 87 cases

Rajasthan: 206 cases

=== 15 May ===
100 deaths & 3997 cases were reported. New cases were reported in the states/UTs as following:

Rajasthan: 213 cases

Andhra Pradesh: 57 cases

Uttar Pradesh: 43 cases

Kerala: 16 cases

Karnatakaː 69 cases

Jharkhandː 2 cases

Maharashtraː 1576 cases

West Bengalː 84 cases

Punjabː 13 cases

=== 16 May ===
100 deaths & 3970 cases were reported.

Punjab government announced for extension of lockdown until 31 May. New cases were reported in the states/UTs as following:

Delhi: 438 cases

Bihar: 46 cases

Tamil Nadu: 447 cases

Kerala: 87 cases

Karnataka: 36 cases

West Bengal: 115 cases

Andhra Pradesh: 102 cases

Uttar Pradesh: 155 cases

Maharashtraː 884 cases were reported in the Mumbai city.

Jammu and Kashmirː 108 cases

Gujaratː1057 cases

Rajasthan: 213 cases from which 119 were inmates from District Jail, Jaipur.

=== 17 May ===
120 deaths & 4987 cases were reported.

Maharashtra, Mizoram & Tamil Nadu government extended the lockdown until 31 May. But later NDMA extended the lockdown until 31 May in all Indian states. New cases were reported in the states/UTs as following:

Andhra Pradesh: 25 cases

Karnataka: 54 cases

Tamil Nadu: 639 cases

Punjab: 18 cases

Bihar: 58 cases

Kerala: 14 cases

Himachal Pradesh: 2 cases

Maharashtraː 2347 cases

Jammu and Kashmirː 62 cases

Rajasthan: 242 cases

=== 18 May ===
157 deaths & 5242 cases were reported. New cases were reported in the states/UTs as following:

Uttarakhand: 1 case was reported in the state.

Bihar: 37 cases

Himachal Pradesh: 5 cases

Karnataka: 99 cases

Kerala: 29 cases

Assam: 2 cases

Tamil Nadu: 536 cases

Punjab: 16 cases

Delhi: 299 cases & taking the total tally in the state to 10000 mark.

Gujaratː 366 cases

Odishaː 48 cases

Rajasthanː 305 cases

Maharashtraː 2033 cases

=== 19 May ===
134 deaths & 4970 cases were reported.

The total tally of cases crosses 100,000 mark. New cases were reported in the states/UTs as following:

Karnataka: 127 cases

Andhra Pradesh: 57 cases

Chhattisgarh : 57 cases

Himachal Pradesh: 10 cases

Kerala: 12 cases

Bihar: 53 cases

Uttarakhand: 8 cases

Assam: 13 cases

Gujarat: 395 cases

Tamil Nadu: 601 cases

Jammu and Kashmirː 28 cases

West Bengalː 136 cases

Punjabː 22 cases & taking the total tally in state to 2000 mark.

Rajasthanː 338 cases

Maharashtraː 2127 cases

=== 20 May ===
140 deaths & 5611 cases were reported. New cases were reported in the states/UTs as following:

Delhi: 534 cases

Uttarakhand: 18 cases

Karnataka: 67 cases

Kerala: 24 cases

Gujarat: 398 cases

Assam: 13 cases

Punjab: 3 cases

Tamil Nadu: 743 cases & total tally of cases in a state crosses 13,000-mark.

West Bengal: 142 cases

Maharashtra: 2250 cases

Jammu and Kashmirː 73 cases

Haryana: 29 cases

Jharkhand: 33 cases

Rajasthan: 170 cases

=== 21 May ===
132 deaths & 5609 cases were reported. New cases were reported in the states/UTs as following:

Uttrakhand: 10 cases

Bihar: 96 cases

Tamil Nadu: 776 cases

Punjab: 23 cases

Karnataka: 143 cases

Delhi: 571 cases

Gujarat: 371 cases

Maharashtra: 2345 cases

Rajasthan: 212 cases

=== 22 May ===
148 deaths & 6088 cases were reported. New cases were reported in the states/UTs as following:

Uttrakhand: 5 cases

Chhattisgarh: 16 cases

Tamil Nadu: 786 cases

Assam: 12 cases

Bihar: 118 cases

Kerala: 42 cases

Karnataka: 138 cases

Gujarat: 363 cases

Maharashtra: 2940 cases

Rajasthan: 267 cases

=== 23 May ===
137 deaths & 6654 cases were reported. New cases were reported in the states/UTs as following:

Delhi: 591 cases

Assam: 53 cases

Tamil Nadu: 710 cases

Karnataka: 262 cases

Punjab: 16 cases

Maharashtra: 2608 cases

Rajasthan: 248 cases

=== 24 May ===
New cases were reported in the states/UTs as following:

Uttrakhand: 53 cases

Haryana: 21 cases

Tamil Nadu: 765 cases

Assam: 4 cases

Maharashtra: 3041 cases

Rajasthan: 286 cases

=== 25 May ===
154 deaths & 6977 cases were reported. New cases were reported in the states/UTs as following:

Uttarakhand: 25 cases

Karnataka: 69 cases

Tamil Nadu: 805 cases

Punjab: 21 cases

Gujarat: 405 cases

Maharashtra: 2436 cases

Delhi: 635 cases

Rajasthan: 272 cases

=== 26 May ===
146 deaths & 6535 cases were reported. New cases were reported in the states/UTs as following:

Kerala: 67 cases

Uttarakhand: 51 cases

Punjab: 25 cases

Tamil Nadu: 646 cases

West Bengal: 193 cases

Maharashtra: 2091 cases

Rajasthan: 236 cases

=== 27 May ===
New cases were reported in the states/UTs as following:

Assam: 18 cases

Uttarakhand: 38 cases

Tamil Nadu: 817 cases

Karnataka: 122 cases

Andhra Pradesh: 68 cases

Maharashtra: 2190 cases

Rajasthan: 280 cases

=== 28 May ===
194 deaths & 6566 cases were reported. New cases were reported in the states/UTs as following:

Andhra Pradesh: 54 cases

Odisha: 67 cases

West Bengal: 344 cases

Tamil Nadu: 827 cases

Karnataka: 115 cases

Rajasthan: 251 cases

=== 29 May ===
265 deaths & 7964 cases were reported. New cases were reported in the states/UTs as following:

Uttarakhand: 102 cases

Karnataka: 248 cases

Tamil Nadu: 874 cases

Jammu and Kashmirː 128 cases

Maharashtra: 2682 cases

Rajasthan: 298 cases

=== 30 May ===
Ministry of Home Affairs extended the lockdown until 30 June. New cases were reported in the states/UTs as following:

Bihar: 150 cases

Andhra Pradesh: 131 cases

Haryana: 202 cases

Karnataka: 141 cases

Tamil Nadu: 856 cases

Gujaratː 412 cases

Delhiː 1163 cases

Maharashtraː 2940 cases

Rajasthan: 252 cases

=== 31 May ===
New cases were reported in the states/UTs as following:

Uttarakhand: 53 cases

West Bengal: 371 cases

Tamil Nadu: 1149 cases

Kerala: 1149 cases

Delhi: 1295 cases

Maharashtra: 2487 cases

Rajasthan: 214 cases
