= Moranwali =

- village
- Location in Punjab, India Moranwali (India)
- Coordinates: 31°15′N 76°04′E
- Country: India
- State: Punjab
- District: Hoshiarpur

Population (2001)
  - Total: 3,097

Languages
  - Official: Punjabi
- Time zone: UTC+5:30 (IST)
- Vehicle registration: PB-24
- Coastline: 0 kilometres (0 mi)

Moranwali is a village near Banga, Punjab, India but falls in Tehsil Garhshankar (Hoshiarpur), Hoshiarpur district, in Punjab state.

== Demographics ==
According to the 2001 Census, Moranwali has a population of 3,097 people. Neighbouring villages include Possi, Aema Mughlan, Ladhana Ucha and Pathlawa.

== History ==
According to local legend, Moranwali was built by the Rai Jats of Thalla, Jalandhar.

The Rai moved to Khusropur, Jalandhar as Maharaja Ranjit Singh rewarded the Rai by giving land in recognition of their contribution in annexing Jalandhar to his kingdom in 1811.

During the 1840s, the British built a cantonment and ordered many Rai to leave Khusropur and construct a new village, Moranwali.

Moranwali is so named as the land had many peacocks. The village was completed in 1850 and other Jat clans, such as the Gills, Sandhus and the Hayers joined the Rai and Shergills to live in the village.

== Around Moranwali ==
The village is famous for its connection to Shaheed Bhagat Singh as his mother's family hails from Moranwali. Moranwali is also known for the shrine of Baba Bhagtu Ji.
