= Pathlawa =

Coordinates: 31.2436°N 76.0222°E

- Village
- Interactive map of Pathlawa
- Country: India
- State: Punjab
- District: Shahid Bhagat Singh Nagar

Population (2001)
  - Total: 2,364

Pathlawa is a village near Banga in the Shahid Bhagat Singh Nagar district, Punjab state, India. According to the 2001 Census, Pathlawa has a population of 2,364 people. Neighbouring villages include Moranwali, and Ladhana Ucha.
