= Okha =

Krishna's grand daughter in law Uṣā is known as Okha in Gujarati language.

Okha may also refer to:

- Okha, India, a town in Gujarat, India
  - Okha Port
  - Okha railway station
- Okha, Russia, a town in Russia
  - Okha Airport

== See also ==
- Usha (disambiguation)
- Oka (disambiguation)
- Yokosuka MXY-7 Ohka, a Japanese attack plane
