= Usa, Russia =

Usa (Russian: Уса) is the name of two rural localities in Russia:

- Usa, Republic of Bashkortostan, a village in Blagoveshchensky District of the Republic of Bashkortostan
- Usa, Komi Republic, a settlement under the administrative jurisdiction of the town of Inta in the Komi Republic
