= Usha =

Usha may refer to:

== Geography ==
- Usha (ancient city), an archaeological site in western part of Galilee, Israel
- Usha, Israel, a modern kibbutz
- Usha, Purba Bardhaman, a village in India

== Personal name ==
=== Mythology ===
- Ushas or Usha, a Vedic goddess
- Uṣā, daughter of Asura Banasura
  - Usha Parinayam (transl. Marriage of Usha), an Indian drama

=== Given name ===
- Usha (actress) (born 1972), Indian actress and singer in Malayalam movies
- Usha (Telugu singer) (born 1980), Indian singer in Telugu language
- Usha Choudhari (born 1942), Indian National Congress politician
- Usha Gupta, a fictional character in The Archers
- Usha Haley, American academic
- Usha Majere, a fictional character in Dragonlance
- Usha Mangeshkar (born 1935), Indian singer
- Usha Mehta (1920–2000), Indian Gandhian and freedom fighter
- Usha Menon, Indian-British gynaecologist
- Usha Sanyal, historian specializing in Asia
- Usha Uthup (born 1947), Indian singer
- K. K. Usha (1939–2020), Chief Justice of the high court of Kerala, India from 2000 to 2001
- P. T. Usha (born 1964), Indian athlete
- Usha Vance (born 1986), American attorney, second lady of the USA

== Acronyms ==
- United States Housing Authority
- United States Handball Association

== See also ==
- Usa (disambiguation), alternative transliteration
- Ucha (disambiguation)
- Okha (disambiguation)
