= Unisan =

Unisan may refer to:

- Unisan, Quezon
- Unisan Island, Guimaras, Philippines
