= Ucha, Kapurthala =

Ucha
- Village
- Location in Punjab, India Ucha (India)
- Coordinates: 31.380004°N 75.250823°E
- Country: India
- State: Punjab
- District: Kapurthala

Government
  - Body: Gram panchayat

Population (2011)
  - Total: 2,082
- Sex ratio 1127/955♂/♀

Languages
  - Official: Punjabi
  - Other spoken: Hindi
- Time zone: UTC+5:30 (IST)
- PIN: 144804
- Telephone code: 01822
- ISO 3166 code: IN-PB
- Vehicle registration: PB-09
- Website: kapurthala.gov.in

Ucha is a village in Kapurthala district of Punjab State, India. It is located 14 kilometres (8.7 mi) from Kapurthala, which is both district and sub-district headquarters of Ucha. The village is administrated by a Sarpanch, who is an elected representative.

== Demography ==
According to the report published by Census India in 2011, Ucha has total number of 422 houses and population of 2,082 of which include 1,127 males and 955 females. Literacy rate of Ucha is 78.56%, higher than state average of 75.84%. The population of children under the age of 6 years is 221 which is 10.61% of total population of Ucha, and child sex ratio is approximately 826, lower than state average of 846.

== Population data ==
Particulars	Total	Male	Female
Total No. of Houses	422	-	-
Population	2,082	1,127	955
Child (0-6)	221	121	100
Schedule Caste	551	302	249
Schedule Tribe	0	0	0
Literates	1,462	830	632
Illiterate	620	297	323
Total Workers	817	669	148
Main Worker	569	525	44
Marginal Worker	248	144	104

== Notable people ==
Sukhdev Singh Bhangu, Former Assistant Professor, PAU Ludhiana.

Er. Darshan Singh Bhangu, Addl.SE, JALANDHAR, PSPCL Punjab.

== Culture ==
All the population speaks Punjabi which is the mother tongue as well as the official language here.

== Religion ==
As of religion, Sikhism predominates the village with other minorities.

== Air travel connectivity ==
The closest airport to the village is Sri Guru Ram Dass Jee International Airport.
