= U of SA =

U of SA, U. of SA, U of S.A., or U. of S.A. may refer to:

== Universities ==
- University of South Africa, in South Africa
- University of South Alabama, in Alabama
- University of South Australia, in Australia
- University of Salerno, in Italy
- University of San Antonio, in Texas
- University of St Andrews, in the Scotland
- University of Saint Anthony, in the Philippines
- Universidade de Santo Amaro in Brazil

== Other uses ==
- Union of South Africa, the official name of South Africa from 1910 to 1961

== See also ==
- USA (disambiguation)
