= Usa, Republic of Bashkortostan =

Usa Уса
- Village
- Location within Bashkortostan Location within Russia
- Coordinates: 55°03′N 56°21′E
- Country: Russia
- Region: Bashkortostan
- District: Blagoveshchensky District
- Time zone: UTC+5:00

Usa (Russian: Уса; Bashkir: Уҫы, Uśı) is a rural locality (a village) in Ilyino-Polyansky Selsoviet, Blagoveshchensky District, Bashkortostan, Russia. The population was 11 as of 2010. There is 1 street.

== Geography ==
Usa is located 34 km east of Blagoveshchensk (the district's administrative centre) by road. Sokolovskoye is the nearest rural locality.
