= Ladhana Ucha =

- Village
- Location in Punjab, India Ladhana Ucha (India)
- Coordinates: 31.2234906°N 76.0336411°E
- Country: India
- State: Punjab
- District: Shaheed Bhagat Singh Nagar

Government
  - Type: Panchayat raj
  - Body: Gram panchayat
- Elevation: 251 m (823 ft)

Population (2011)
  - Total: 1,971
- Sex ratio 956/1015 ♂/♀

Languages
  - Official: Punjabi
- Time zone: UTC+5:30 (IST)
- PIN: 144510
- Telephone code: 01823
- ISO 3166 code: IN-PB
- Post office: Ladhana Jhikka
- Website: nawanshahr.nic.in

Ladhana Ucha is a village in Shaheed Bhagat Singh Nagar district of Punjab State, India. It is located 2 kilometres (1.2 mi) away from postal head office Ladhana Jhikka, 20 kilometres (12 mi) from Nawanshahr, 18 kilometres (11 mi) from district headquarter Shaheed Bhagat Singh Nagar and 110 kilometres (68 mi) from state capital Chandigarh. The village is administrated by Sarpanch an elected representative of the village.

== Demography ==
As of 2011, Ladhana Ucha has a total number of 434 houses and population of 1971 of which 956 include are males while 1015 are females according to the report published by Census India in 2011. The literacy rate of Ladhana Ucha is 79.68%, higher than the state average of 75.84%. The population of children under the age of 6 years is 185 which is 9.39% of total population of Ladhana Ucha, and child sex ratio is approximately 968 as compared to Punjab state average of 846.

Most of the people are from Schedule Caste which constitutes 36.94% of total population in Ladhana Ucha. The town does not have any Schedule Tribe population so far.

As per the report published by Census India in 2011, 568 people were engaged in work activities out of the total population of Ladhana Ucha which includes 608 males and 60 females. According to census survey report 2011, 82.11% workers describe their work as main work and 17.89% workers are involved in Marginal activity providing livelihood for less than 6 months.

== Education ==
Amardeep Singh Shergill Memorial college Mukandpur and Sikh National College Banga are the nearest colleges. Industrial Training Institute for women (ITI Nawanshahr) is 21 kilometres (13 mi) The village is 67 kilometres (42 mi) from Indian Institute of Technology and 37 kilometres (23 mi) away from Lovely Professional University.

List of schools nearby:

- Govt Senior Secondary School, Ladhana Jhikka
- Dashmesh Model School, Kahma
- Govt High School, Jhander Kalan
- Govt Gigh School, Khan Khana
- Guru Ram Dass Public School, Cheta

== Transport ==
Banga railway station is the nearest train station, However, Garhshankar Junction train station is 16 kilometres (9.9 mi) away from the village. Sahnewal Airport is the nearest domestic airport located 66 kilometres (41 mi) away in Ludhiana and the nearest international airport is located in Chandigarh also Sri Guru Ram Dass Jee International Airport is the second nearest airport which is 146 kilometres (91 mi) away in Amritsar.

== See also ==
- List of villages in India
