= Shahabpur =

Sahabpur
- Village
- Location in Punjab, India Sahabpur (India)
- Coordinates: 31.0785925°N 76.183539°E
- Country: India
- State: Punjab
- District: Shaheed Bhagat Singh Nagar

Government
  - Type: Panchayat raj
  - Body: Gram panchayat

Population (2011)
  - Total: 1,244
- Sex ratio 616/628 ♂/♀

Languages
  - Official: Punjabi
- Time zone: UTC+5:30 (IST)
- PIN: 144515
- ISO 3166 code: IN-PB
- Post office: Jadla (S.O)
- Website: nawanshahr.nic.in

Sahabpur also spelt Shahabpur is a village in Shaheed Bhagat Singh Nagar district of Punjab State, India. It is located 4.7 kilometres (2.9 mi) away from sub post office Jadla, 10.6 kilometres (6.6 mi) from Nawanshahr, 19.2 kilometres (11.9 mi) from district headquarter Shaheed Bhagat Singh Nagar and 86 kilometres (53 mi) from state capital Chandigarh. Sahabpur village is the birthplace of Gian Singh (soldier) VC whom was awarded the Victoria Cross the highest and most prestigious award for gallantry in the face of enemy that can be awarded to British and Commonwealth forces by King George VI in a ceremony on 16 October 1945 at Buckingham Palace for Gian Singh’s efforts in World War II fighting for British India. At the age of 24 Years old, and a Naik in the 15th Punjab regiment in the British Indian Army, when during the Burma Campaign 1944-45 of World War II he performed the deeds for which he awarded the VC. Gian Singh attended the Victoria Cross and George Cross Association reunions every Second year and dinner hosted on the third day of the reunion at Buckingham Palace by UK Monarch for example, Queen Elizabeth The Queen Mother and other members of the British royal family. Gian Singh’s name appears on the “Memorial Gates” at Constitution Hill, London SW1 near Buckingham Palace. Gian Singh VC died on 6 October 1996. His funeral and cannon gun salute by army personnel was held at the village. The village is administrated by Sarpanch an elected representative of the village.

== Demography ==
As of 2011, Shahabpur has a total number of 276 houses and population of 1244 of which 616 include are males while 628 are females according to the report published by Census India in 2011. The literacy rate of Shahabpur is 79.93% higher than the state average of 75.84%. The population of children under the age of 6 years is 103 which is 8.28% of total population of Shahabpur, and child sex ratio is approximately 1289 as compared to Punjab state average of 846.

Most of the people are from Schedule Caste which constitutes 24.84% of total population in Shahabpur. The town does not have any Schedule Tribe population so far.

As per the report published by Census India in 2011, 398 people were engaged in work activities out of the total population of Shahabpur which includes 364 males and 34 females. According to census survey report 2011, 91.96% workers describe their work as main work and 8.04% workers are involved in Marginal activity providing livelihood for less than 6 months.

== Education ==
The village has both a Primary and secondary school and children from nearby villages travel or walk to Shahabpur for schooling often covering between 1–5 kilometres (0.62–3.11 mi) for example, from the village of Ram Rai Pur, Sajawalpur, Sanawa, Mazara Khurd. KC Engineering College and Doaba Khalsa Trust Group Of Institutions are the nearest colleges. Industrial Training Institute for women (ITI Nawanshahr) is 8.2 kilometres (5.1 mi). The village is 67 kilometres (42 mi) away from Chandigarh University, 43.8 kilometres (27.2 mi) from Indian Institute of Technology and 53 kilometres (33 mi) away from Lovely Professional University.

List of schools nearby

- Govt Upper Primary with Secondary School, Kot Ranjha
- Govt Upper Primary with Secondary/Higher Secondary School, Jadla
- Govt Primary School, Chhokran
- Govt Primary School, Ranewal

== Transport ==
Nawanshahr train station is the nearest train station however, Garhshankar Junction railway station is 21 kilometres (13 mi) away from the village. Sahnewal Airport is the nearest domestic airport which located 57 kilometres (35 mi) away in Ludhiana and the nearest international airport is located in Chandigarh also Sri Guru Ram Dass Jee International Airport is the second nearest airport which is 162 kilometres (101 mi) away in Amritsar.

== See also ==
- List of villages in India
