= Sheikhupur Bagh =

- Village
- Location in Punjab, India Sheikhupur Bagh (India)
- Coordinates: 31.0546588°N 76.1910855°E
- Country: India
- State: Punjab
- District: Shaheed Bhagat Singh Nagar

Government
  - Type: Panchayat raj
  - Body: Gram panchayat

Population (2011)
  - Total: 924
- Sex ratio 474/450 ♂/♀

Languages
  - Official: Punjabi
- Time zone: UTC+5:30 (IST)
- PIN: 144515
- ISO 3166 code: IN-PB
- Post office: Jadla (S.O)
- Website: nawanshahr.nic.in

Sheikhupur Bagh is a village in Shaheed Bhagat Singh Nagar district of Punjab State, India. It is located 4 kilometres (2.5 mi) away from sub post office Jadla, 15 kilometres (9.3 mi) from Nawanshahr, 19.8 kilometres (12.3 mi) from district headquarter Shaheed Bhagat Singh Nagar and 83.6 kilometres (51.9 mi) from state capital Chandigarh. The village is administrated by Sarpanch an elected representative of the village.

== Demography ==
As of 2011, Sheikhupur Bagh has a total number of 181 houses and population of 924 of which 474 include are males while 450 are females according to the report published by Census India in 2011. The literacy rate of Sheikhupur Bagh is 79.28% higher than the state average of 75.84%. The population of children under the age of 6 years is 89 which is 9.63% of total population of Sheikhupur Bagh, and child sex ratio is approximately 1225 as compared to Punjab state average of 846.

Most of the people are from Schedule Caste which constitutes 33.44% of total population in Sheikhupur Bagh. The town does not have any Schedule Tribe population so far.

As per the report published by Census India in 2011, 310 people were engaged in work activities out of the total population of Sheikhupur Bagh which includes 283 males and 27 females. According to census survey report 2011, 88.06% workers describe their work as main work and 11.94% workers are involved in Marginal activity providing livelihood for less than 6 months.

== Education ==
The village has no school and children either travel or walk to other villages for schooling often covering between 8–10 kilometres (5.0–6.2 mi). KC Engineering College and Doaba Khalsa Trust Group Of Institutions are the nearest colleges. Industrial Training Institute for women (ITI Nawanshahr) is 12 kilometres (7.5 mi). The village is 64 kilometres (40 mi) away from Chandigarh University, 41 kilometres (25 mi) from Indian Institute of Technology and 58 kilometres (36 mi) away from Lovely Professional University.

List of schools nearby

- Govt Upper Primary with Secondary School, Kot Ranjha
- Govt Upper Primary with Secondary/Higher Secondary School, Jadla
- Govt Primary School, Chhokran
- Govt Primary School, Ranewal

== Transport ==
Nawanshahr train station is the nearest train station however, Garhshankar Junction railway station is 23 kilometres (14 mi) away from the village. Sahnewal Airport is the nearest domestic airport which located 58 kilometres (36 mi) away in Ludhiana and the nearest international airport is located in Chandigarh also Sri Guru Ram Dass Jee International Airport is the second nearest airport which is 167 kilometres (104 mi) away in Amritsar.

== See also ==
- List of villages in India
