= Sheikhe Mazara =

- Village
- Location in Punjab, India Sheikhe Mazara (India)
- Coordinates: 31.026812°N 76.1276543°E
- Country: India
- State: Punjab
- District: Shaheed Bhagat Singh Nagar

Government
  - Type: Panchayat raj
  - Body: Gram panchayat

Population (2011)
  - Total: 393
- Sex ratio 204/189 ♂/♀

Languages
  - Official: Punjabi
- Time zone: UTC+5:30 (IST)
- PIN: 144517
- ISO 3166 code: IN-PB
- Post office: Rahon (S.O)
- Website: nawanshahr.nic.in

Sheikhe Mazara is a village in Shaheed Bhagat Singh Nagar district of Punjab State, India. It is located 3 kilometres (1.9 mi) away from sub post office Rahon, 12.8 kilometres (8.0 mi) from Nawanshahr, 13.7 kilometres (8.5 mi) from district headquarter Shaheed Bhagat Singh Nagar and 86 kilometres (53 mi) from state capital Chandigarh. The village is administrated by Sarpanch an elected representative of the village.

== Demography ==
As of 2011, Sheikhe Mazara has a total number of 81 houses and population of 393 of which 204 include are males while 189 are females according to the report published by Census India in 2011. The literacy rate of Sheikhe Mazara is 93.66% higher than the state average of 75.84%. The population of children under the age of 6 years is 46 which is 11.70% of total population of Sheikhe Mazara, and child sex ratio is approximately 1091 as compared to Punjab state average of 846.

Most of the people are from Schedule Caste which constitutes 88.30% of total population in Sheikhe Mazara. The town does not have any Schedule Tribe population so far.

As per the report published by Census India in 2011, 96 people were engaged in work activities out of the total population of Sheikhe Mazara which includes 92 males and 4 females. According to census survey report 2011, 97.92% workers describe their work as main work and 2.08% workers are involved in Marginal activity providing livelihood for less than 6 months.

== Education ==
The village has no school and children either travel or walk to other villages for schooling often covering between 8–10 kilometres (5.0–6.2 mi). KC Engineering College and Doaba Khalsa Trust Group Of Institutions are the nearest colleges. Industrial Training Institute for women (ITI Nawanshahr) is 13.8 kilometres (8.6 mi). The village is 62 kilometres (39 mi) away from Chandigarh University, 56.2 kilometres (34.9 mi) from Indian Institute of Technology and 56.3 kilometres (35.0 mi) away from Lovely Professional University.

List of schools nearby

- Govt Upper Primary with Secondary School, Kot Ranjha
- Govt Upper Primary with Secondary/Higher Secondary School, Jadla
- Govt Primary School, Chhokran
- Govt Primary School, Ranewal

== Transport ==
Nawanshahr train station is the nearest train station however, Garhshankar Junction railway station is 24 kilometres (15 mi) away from the village. Sahnewal Airport is the nearest domestic airport which located 43.6 kilometres (27.1 mi) away in Ludhiana and the nearest international airport is located in Chandigarh also Sri Guru Ram Dass Jee International Airport is the second nearest airport which is 165 kilometres (103 mi) away in Amritsar.

== See also ==
- List of villages in India
