= Shamspur =

- Village
- Location in Punjab, India Shamspur (India)
- Coordinates: 31.0208096°N 76.1732002°E
- Country: India
- State: Punjab
- District: Shaheed Bhagat Singh Nagar

Government
  - Type: Panchayat raj
  - Body: Gram panchayat

Population (2011)
  - Total: 590
- Sex ratio 289/301 ♂/♀

Languages
  - Official: Punjabi
- Time zone: UTC+5:30 (IST)
- PIN: 144517
- ISO 3166 code: IN-PB
- Post office: Bahloor Kalan (B.O)
- Website: nawanshahr.nic.in

Shamspur is a village in Shaheed Bhagat Singh Nagar district of Punjab State, India. It is located 1.9 kilometres (1.2 mi) away from branch post office Bahloor Kalan, 18 kilometres (11 mi) from Nawanshahr, 19 kilometres (12 mi) from district headquarter Shaheed Bhagat Singh Nagar and 88 kilometres (55 mi) from state capital Chandigarh. The village is administrated by Sarpanch an elected representative of the village.

== Demography ==
As of 2011, Shamspur has a total number of 134 houses and population of 590 of which 289 include are males while 301 are females according to the report published by Census India in 2011. The literacy rate of Shamspur is 70.35% lower than the state average of 75.84%. The population of children under the age of 6 years is 74 which is 12.54% of total population of Shamspur, and child sex ratio is approximately 1000 as compared to Punjab state average of 846.

Most of the people are from Schedule Caste which constitutes 26.78% of total population in Shamspur. The town does not have any Schedule Tribe population so far.

As per the report published by Census India in 2011, 404 people were engaged in work activities out of the total population of Shamspur which includes 194 males and 210 females. According to census survey report 2011, 91.83% workers describe their work as main work and 8.17% workers are involved in Marginal activity providing livelihood for less than 6 months.

== Education ==
The village has no school and children either travel or walk to other villages for schooling often covering between 8–10 kilometres (5.0–6.2 mi). KC Engineering College and Doaba Khalsa Trust Group Of Institutions are the nearest colleges. Industrial Training Institute for women (ITI Nawanshahr) is 16 kilometres (9.9 mi). The village is 64 kilometres (40 mi) away from Chandigarh University, 48 kilometres (30 mi) from Indian Institute of Technology and 62 kilometres (39 mi) away from Lovely Professional University.

List of schools nearby

- Govt Upper Primary with Secondary School, Kot Ranjha
- Govt Upper Primary with Secondary/Higher Secondary School, Jadla
- Govt Primary School, Chhokran
- Govt Primary School, Ranewal

== Transport ==
Nawanshahr train station is the nearest train station however, Garhshankar Junction railway station is 31 kilometres (19 mi) away from the village. Sahnewal Airport is the nearest domestic airport which located 45 kilometres (28 mi) away in Ludhiana and the nearest international airport is located in Chandigarh also Sri Guru Ram Dass Jee International Airport is the second nearest airport which is 171 kilometres (106 mi) away in Amritsar.

== See also ==
- List of villages in India
