= Sultanpur, SBS Nagar =

Sultanpur
- Village
- Location in Punjab, India Sultanpur (India)
- Coordinates: 31.0265628°N 76.1606679°E
- Country: India
- State: Punjab
- District: Shaheed Bhagat Singh Nagar

Government
  - Type: Panchayat raj
  - Body: Gram panchayat

Population (2011)
  - Total: 229
- Sex ratio 120/109 ♂/♀

Languages
  - Official: Punjabi
- Time zone: UTC+5:30 (IST)
- PIN: 144419
- ISO 3166 code: IN-PB
- Post office: Dayalpur (S.O)
- Website: nawanshahr.nic.in

Sultanpur is a village in Shaheed Bhagat Singh Nagar district of Punjab State, India. It is located 31 kilometres (19 mi) away from sub post office Dayalpur, 16 kilometres (9.9 mi) from Nawanshahr, 18 kilometres (11 mi) from district headquarter Shaheed Bhagat Singh Nagar and 88 kilometres (55 mi) from state capital Chandigarh. The village is administrated by Sarpanch an elected representative of the village.

== Demography ==
As of 2011, Sultanpur has a total number of 48 houses and population of 229 of which 120 are males while 109 are females according to the report published by Census India in 2011. The literacy rate of Sultanpur is 74.29% lower than the state average of 75.84%. The population of children under the age of 6 years is 19 which is 8.30% of total population of Sultanpur, and child sex ratio is approximately 900 as compared to Punjab state average of 846.

Most of the people are from Schedule Caste which constitutes 66.81% of total population in Sultanpur. The town does not have any Schedule Tribe population so far.

As per the report published by Census India in 2011, 133 people were engaged in work activities out of the total population of Sultanpur which includes 71 males and 62 females. According to census survey report 2011, 48.87% workers describe their work as main work and 51.53% workers are involved in Marginal activity providing livelihood for less than 6 months.

== Education ==
The village has no school and children either travel or walk to other villages for schooling often covering between 8–10 kilometres (5.0–6.2 mi). KC Engineering College and Doaba Khalsa Trust Group Of Institutions are the nearest colleges. Industrial Training Institute for women (ITI Nawanshahr) is 16 kilometres (9.9 mi). The village is 64 kilometres (40 mi) away from Chandigarh University, 52 kilometres (32 mi) from Indian Institute of Technology and 61 kilometres (38 mi) away from Lovely Professional University.

List of schools nearby

- Govt Upper Primary with Secondary School, Kot Ranjha
- Govt Upper Primary with Secondary/Higher Secondary School, Jadla
- Govt Primary School, Chhokran
- Govt Primary School, Ranewal

== Transport ==
Nawanshahr train station is the nearest train station however, Garhshankar Junction railway station is 28 kilometres (17 mi) away from the village. Sahnewal Airport is the nearest domestic airport which located 45 kilometres (28 mi) away in Ludhiana and the nearest international airport is located in Chandigarh also Sri Guru Ram Dass Jee International Airport is the second nearest airport which is 170 kilometres (110 mi) away in Amritsar.

== See also ==
- List of villages in India
