= Shahbazpur, SBS Nagar =

Shahbazpur
- Village
- Location in Punjab, India Shahbazpur (India)
- Coordinates: 30.9484398°N 76.2140453°E
- Country: India
- State: Punjab
- District: Shaheed Bhagat Singh Nagar

Government
  - Type: Panchayat raj
  - Body: Gram panchayat

Population (2011)
  - Total: 987
- Sex ratio 487/500 ♂/♀

Languages
  - Official: Punjabi
- Time zone: UTC+5:30 (IST)
- PIN: 144517
- ISO 3166 code: IN-PB
- Post office: Kot Ranjha (B.O)
- Website: nawanshahr.nic.in

Shahbazpur is a village in Shaheed Bhagat Singh Nagar district of Punjab State, India. It is located 24 kilometres (15 mi) away from branch post office Kot Ranjha, 29 kilometres (18 mi) from Nawanshahr, 30 kilometres (19 mi) from district headquarter Shaheed Bhagat Singh Nagar and 78 kilometres (48 mi) from state capital Chandigarh. The village is administrated by Sarpanch an elected representative of the village.

== Demography ==
As of 2011, Shahbazpur has a total number of 194 houses and population of 987 of which 487 include are males while 500 are females according to the report published by Census India in 2011. The literacy rate of Shahbazpur is 75.56% lower than the state average of 75.84%. The population of children under the age of 6 years is 95 which is 9.63% of total population of Shahbazpur, and child sex ratio is approximately 827 as compared to Punjab state average of 846.

Most of the people are from Schedule Caste which constitutes 43.36% of total population in Shahbazpur. The town does not have any Schedule Tribe population so far.

As per the report published by Census India in 2011, 266 people were engaged in work activities out of the total population of Shahbazpur which includes 239 males and 27 females. According to census survey report 2011, 94.74% workers describe their work as main work and 5.26% workers are involved in Marginal activity providing livelihood for less than 6 months.

== Education ==
The village has no school and children either travel or walk to other villages for schooling often covering between 8–10 kilometres (5.0–6.2 mi). KC Engineering College and Doaba Khalsa Trust Group Of Institutions are the nearest colleges. Industrial Training Institute for women (ITI Nawanshahr) is 30 kilometres (19 mi). The village is 54 kilometres (34 mi) away from Chandigarh University, 40 kilometres (25 mi) from Indian Institute of Technology and 72 kilometres (45 mi) away from Lovely Professional University.

List of schools nearby

- Govt Upper Primary with Secondary School, Kot Ranjha
- Govt Upper Primary with Secondary/Higher Secondary School, Jadla
- Govt Primary School, Chhokran
- Govt Primary School, Ranewal

== Transport ==
Nawanshahr train station is the nearest train station however, Garhshankar Junction railway station is 40 kilometres (25 mi) away from the village. Sahnewal Airport is the nearest domestic airport which located 35 kilometres (22 mi) away in Ludhiana and the nearest international airport is located in Chandigarh also Sri Guru Ram Dass Jee International Airport is the second nearest airport which is 182 kilometres (113 mi) away in Amritsar.

== See also ==
- List of villages in India
