= Sanawa =

- Village
- Location in Punjab, India Sanawa (India)
- Coordinates: 31.095301°N 76.1890429°E
- Country: India
- State: Punjab
- District: Shaheed Bhagat Singh Nagar

Government
  - Type: Panchayat raj
  - Body: Gram panchayat
- Elevation: 355 m (1,165 ft)

Population (2011)
  - Total: 1,463
- Sex ratio 719/744 ♂/♀

Languages
  - Official: Punjabi
- Time zone: UTC+5:30 (IST)
- PIN: 144516
- Telephone code: 01823
- ISO 3166 code: IN-PB
- Post office: Langroya (S.O)
- Website: nawanshahr.nic.in

Sanawa is a village in Shaheed Bhagat Singh Nagar district of Punjab State, India. It is located 3.7 kilometres (2.3 mi) away from sub post office Langroya, 9.4 kilometres (5.8 mi) from Nawanshahr, 17 kilometres (11 mi) from district headquarter Shaheed Bhagat Singh Nagar and 83.7 kilometres (52.0 mi) from state capital Chandigarh. The village is administrated by Sarpanch an elected representative of the village.

== Demography ==
As of 2011, Sanawa has a total number of 312 houses and population of 1463 of which 719 include are males while 744 are females according to the report published by Census India in 2011. The literacy rate of Sanawa is 82.76% higher than the state average of 75.84%. The population of children under the age of 6 years is 158 which is 10.80% of total population of Sanawa, and child sex ratio is approximately 681 as compared to Punjab state average of 846.

Most of the people are from Schedule Caste which constitutes 43.40% of total population in Sanawa. The town does not have any Schedule Tribe population so far.

As per the report published by Census India in 2011, 397 people were engaged in work activities out of the total population of Sanawa which includes 354 males and 43 females. According to census survey report 2011, 90.18% workers describe their work as main work and 9.82% workers are involved in Marginal activity providing livelihood for less than 6 months.

== Education ==
The village has no school and children either travel or walk to other villages for schooling often covering between 8–10 kilometres (5.0–6.2 mi). KC Engineering College and Doaba Khalsa Trust Group Of Institutions are the nearest colleges. Industrial Training Institute for women (ITI Nawanshahr) is 7 kilometres (4.3 mi). The village is 64 kilometres (40 mi) away from Chandigarh University, 41 kilometres (25 mi) from Indian Institute of Technology and 52 kilometres (32 mi) away from Lovely Professional University.

List of schools nearby

- Govt Upper Primary with Secondary School, Kot Ranjha
- Govt Upper Primary with Secondary/Higher Secondary School, Jadla
- Govt Primary School, Chhokran
- Govt Primary School, Ranewal

== Transport ==
Nawanshahr train station is the nearest train station however, Garhshankar Junction railway station is 20 kilometres (12 mi) away from the village. Sahnewal Airport is the nearest domestic airport which located 59 kilometres (37 mi) away in Ludhiana and the nearest international airport is located in Chandigarh also Sri Guru Ram Dass Jee International Airport is the second nearest airport which is 161 kilometres (100 mi) away in Amritsar.

== See also ==
- List of villages in India
