= Mazara Kalan =

- Village
- Location in Punjab, India Mazara Kalan (India)
- Coordinates: 31.076911°N 76.1967248°E
- Country: India
- State: Punjab
- District: Shaheed Bhagat Singh Nagar

Government
  - Type: Panchayat raj
  - Body: Gram panchayat
- Elevation: 355 m (1,165 ft)

Population (2011)
  - Total: 728
- Sex ratio 349/379 ♂/♀

Languages
  - Official: Punjabi
- Time zone: UTC+5:30 (IST)
- PIN: 144515
- Telephone code: 01823
- ISO 3166 code: IN-PB
- Post office: Jadla (S.O)
- Website: nawanshahr.nic.in

Mazara Kalan is a village in Shaheed Bhagat Singh Nagar district of Punjab State, India. It is located 3.2 kilometres (2.0 mi) away from sub post office Jadla, 11.8 kilometres (7.3 mi) from Nawanshahr, 18.7 kilometres (11.6 mi) from district headquarter Shaheed Bhagat Singh Nagar and 82 kilometres (51 mi) from state capital Chandigarh. The village is administrated by Sarpanch an elected representative of the village.

== Demography ==
As of 2011, Mazara Kalan has a total number of 166 houses and population of 728 of which 349 include are males while 379 are females according to the report published by Census India in 2011. The literacy rate of Mazara Kalan is 72.74% lower than the state average of 75.84%. The population of children under the age of 6 years is 64 which is 8.79% of total population of Mazara Kalan, and child sex ratio is approximately 12.07 as compared to Punjab state average of 846.

Most of the people are from Schedule Caste which constitutes 10.16% of total population in Mazara Kalan. The town does not have any Schedule Tribe population so far.

As per the report published by Census India in 2011, 242 people were engaged in work activities out of the total population of Mazara Kalan which includes 199 males and 43 females. According to census survey report 2011, 75.62% workers describe their work as main work and 24.38% workers are involved in Marginal activity providing livelihood for less than 6 months.

== Education ==
The village has a Punjabi medium, co-ed upper primary with secondary school established in 1976. The school provide mid-day meal as per Indian Midday Meal Scheme. As per Right of Children to Free and Compulsory Education Act the school provide free education to children between the ages of 6 and 14.

KC Engineering College and Doaba Khalsa Trust Group Of Institutions are the nearest colleges. Industrial Training Institute for women (ITI Nawanshahr) is 9.2 kilometres (5.7 mi). The village is 63.8 kilometres (39.6 mi) away from Chandigarh University, 40 kilometres (25 mi) from Indian Institute of Technology and 55 kilometres (34 mi) away from Lovely Professional University.

List of schools nearby:

- Dashmesh Model School, Kahma
- Govt Primary School, Kahlon
- Govt High School, Garcha

== Transport ==
Nawanshahr train station is the nearest train station however, Garhshankar Junction railway station is 22 kilometres (14 mi) away from the village. Sahnewal Airport is the nearest domestic airport which located 57 kilometres (35 mi) away in Ludhiana and the nearest international airport is located in Chandigarh also Sri Guru Ram Dass Jee International Airport is the second nearest airport which is 164 kilometres (102 mi) away in Amritsar.

== See also ==
- List of villages in India
