= Muzaffarpur, SBS Nagar =

Muzaffarpur
- Village
- Location in Punjab, India Muzaffarpur (India)
- Coordinates: 31.0447212°N 76.2241048°E
- Country: India
- State: Punjab
- District: Shaheed Bhagat Singh Nagar

Government
  - Type: Panchayat raj
  - Body: Gram panchayat

Population (2011)
  - Total: 775
- Sex ratio 394/381 ♂/♀

Languages
  - Official: Punjabi
- Time zone: UTC+5:30 (IST)
- PIN: 144515
- ISO 3166 code: IN-PB
- Post office: Jadla (S.O)
- Website: nawanshahr.nic.in

Muzaffarpur is a village in Shaheed Bhagat Singh Nagar district of Punjab State, India. It is located 5.6 kilometres (3.5 mi) away from sub post office Jadla, 16.7 kilometres (10.4 mi) from Nawanshahr, 22 kilometres (14 mi) from district headquarter Shaheed Bhagat Singh Nagar and 85 kilometres (53 mi) from state capital Chandigarh. The village is administrated by Sarpanch an elected representative of the village.

== Demography ==
As of 2011, Muzaffarpur has a total number of 153 houses and population of 775 of which 394 include are males while 381 are females according to the report published by Census India in 2011. The literacy rate of Muzaffarpur is 77.41% higher than the state average of 75.84%. The population of children under the age of 6 years is 80 which is 10.32% of total population of Muzaffarpur, and child sex ratio is approximately 702 as compared to Punjab state average of 846.

Most of the people are from Schedule Caste which constitutes 44.90% of total population in Muzaffarpur. The town does not have any Schedule Tribe population so far.

As per the report published by Census India in 2011, 217 people were engaged in work activities out of the total population of Muzaffarpur which includes 210 males and 7 females. According to census survey report 2011, 98.62% workers describe their work as main work and 1.38% workers are involved in Marginal activity providing livelihood for less than 6 months.

== Education ==
KC Engineering College and Doaba Khalsa Trust Group Of Institutions are the nearest colleges. Industrial Training Institute for women (ITI Nawanshahr) is 14 kilometres (8.7 mi). The village is 66 kilometres (41 mi) away from Chandigarh University, 42 kilometres (26 mi) from Indian Institute of Technology and 60 kilometres (37 mi) away from Lovely Professional University.

List of schools nearby:

- Dashmesh Model School, Kahma
- Govt Primary School, Kahlon
- Govt High School, Garcha

== Transport ==
Nawanshahr train station is the nearest train station however, Garhshankar Junction railway station is 25 kilometres (16 mi) away from the village. Sahnewal Airport is the nearest domestic airport which located 60 kilometres (37 mi) away in Ludhiana and the nearest international airport is located in Chandigarh also Sri Guru Ram Dass Jee International Airport is the second nearest airport which is 168 kilometres (104 mi) away in Amritsar.

== See also ==
- List of villages in India
