= Soheta =

- Village
- Location in Punjab, India Soheta (India)
- Coordinates: 31.0623269°N 76.1690659°E
- Country: India
- State: Punjab
- District: Shaheed Bhagat Singh Nagar

Government
  - Type: Panchayat raj
  - Body: Gram panchayat
- Elevation: 355 m (1,165 ft)

Population (2011)
  - Total: 1,012
- Sex ratio 501/511 ♂/♀

Languages
  - Official: Punjabi
- Time zone: UTC+5:30 (IST)
- PIN: 144515
- Telephone code: 01823
- ISO 3166 code: IN-PB
- Post office: Jadla (S.O)
- Website: nawanshahr.nic.in

Soheta is a village in Shaheed Bhagat Singh Nagar district of Punjab State, India. It is located 6 kilometres (3.7 mi) away from sub post office Jadla, 13.7 kilometres (8.5 mi) from Nawanshahr, 15.7 kilometres (9.8 mi) from district headquarter Shaheed Bhagat Singh Nagar and 85.5 kilometres (53.1 mi) from state capital Chandigarh. The village is administrated by Sarpanch an elected representative of the village.

== Demography ==
As of 2011, Soheta has a total number of 197 houses and population of 1012 of which 501 include are males while 511 are females according to the report published by Census India in 2011. The literacy rate of Soheta is 70.07% lower than the state average of 75.84%. The population of children under the age of 6 years is 110 which is 10.87% of total population of Soheta, and child sex ratio is approximately 1037 as compared to Punjab state average of 846.

Most of the people are from Schedule Caste which constitutes 44.66% of total population in Soheta. The town does not have any Schedule Tribe population so far.

As per the report published by Census India in 2011, 393 people were engaged in work activities out of the total population of Soheta which includes 294 males and 99 females. According to census survey report 2011, 87.53% workers describe their work as main work and 12.47% workers are involved in Marginal activity providing livelihood for less than 6 months.

== Education ==
The village has a Punjabi medium, co-ed primary school established in 1945. The school provide mid-day meal per Indian Midday Meal Scheme. As per Right of Children to Free and Compulsory Education Act the school provide free education to children between the ages of 6 and 14.

KC Engineering College and Doaba Khalsa Trust Group Of Institutions are the nearest colleges. Industrial Training Institute for women (ITI Nawanshahr) is 9.6 kilometres (6.0 mi). The village is 66.6 kilometres (41.4 mi) away from Chandigarh University, 43 kilometres (27 mi) from Indian Institute of Technology and 54.8 kilometres (34.1 mi) away from Lovely Professional University.

== Transport ==
Nawanshahr train station is the nearest train station however, Garhshankar Junction railway station is 22 kilometres (14 mi) away from the village. Sahnewal Airport is the nearest domestic airport which located 54 kilometres (34 mi) away in Ludhiana and the nearest international airport is located in Chandigarh also Sri Guru Ram Dass Jee International Airport is the second nearest airport which is 164 kilometres (102 mi) away in Amritsar.

== See also ==
- List of villages in India
