= Ramgarh, SBS Nagar =

Ramgarh
- Village
- Location in Punjab, India Ramgarh (India)
- Coordinates: 31.0742497°N 76.1818888°E
- Country: India
- State: Punjab
- District: Shaheed Bhagat Singh Nagar

Government
  - Type: Panchayat raj
  - Body: Gram panchayat
- Elevation: 355 m (1,165 ft)

Population (2011)
  - Total: 292
- Sex ratio 144/148 ♂/♀

Languages
  - Official: Punjabi
- Time zone: UTC+5:30 (IST)
- PIN: 144515
- Telephone code: 01823
- ISO 3166 code: IN-PB
- Post office: Jadla (S.O)
- Website: nawanshahr.nic.in

Ramgarh is a village in Shaheed Bhagat Singh Nagar district of Punjab State, India. It is located 3.5 kilometres (2.2 mi) away from sub post office Jadla, 12.3 kilometres (7.6 mi) from Nawanshahr, 17.2 kilometres (10.7 mi) from district headquarter Shaheed Bhagat Singh Nagar and 83 kilometres (52 mi) from state capital Chandigarh. The village is administrated by Sarpanch an elected representative of the village.

== Demography ==
As of 2011, Ramgarh has a total number of 53 houses and population of 292 of which 144 include are males while 148 are females according to the report published by Census India in 2011. The literacy rate of Ramgarh is 64.50% higher than the state average of 75.84%. The population of children under the age of 6 years is 30 which is 10.27% of total population of Ramgarh, and child sex ratio is approximately 1000 as compared to Punjab state average of 846.

Most of the people are from Schedule Caste which constitutes 74.66% of total population in Ramgarh. The town does not have any Schedule Tribe population so far.

As per the report published by Census India in 2011, 86 people were engaged in work activities out of the total population of Ramgarh which includes 82 males and 4 females. According to census survey report 2011, 98.84% workers describe their work as main work and 1.16% workers are involved in Marginal activity providing livelihood for less than 6 months.

== Education ==
The village has a Punjabi medium, co-ed primary school established in 1976. The school provide mid-day meal which prepared in school premisesas per Indian Midday Meal Scheme. As per Right of Children to Free and Compulsory Education Act the school provide free education to children between the ages of 6 and 14.

KC Engineering College and Doaba Khalsa Trust Group Of Institutions are the nearest colleges. Industrial Training Institute for women (ITI Nawanshahr) is 10 kilometres (6.2 mi). The village is 64 kilometres (40 mi) away from Chandigarh University, 40 kilometres (25 mi) from Indian Institute of Technology and 55 kilometres (34 mi) away from Lovely Professional University.

== Transport ==
Phagwara train station is the nearest train station however, Garhshankar Junction railway station is 23 kilometres (14 mi) away from the village. Sahnewal Airport is the nearest domestic airport which located 55 kilometres (34 mi) away in Ludhiana and the nearest international airport is located in Chandigarh also Sri Guru Ram Dass Jee International Airport is the second nearest airport which is 164 kilometres (102 mi) away in Amritsar.

== See also ==
- List of villages in India
