= Gian Singh (soldier) =

Recipient of the Victoria Cross (1915–1996)

Gian Singh VC
- Born: 5 October 1920; Sahabpur, Punjab, India
- Died: 6 October 1996 (aged 76); Jullundur
- Military career
- Allegiance: British India; India
- Branch: British Indian Army; Indian Army
- Service years: 1937–1969
- Rank: Hon. Captain (Subedar-Major)
- Units: 15th Punjab Regiment; Sikh Regiment
- Conflicts: World War II; Sino-Indian War; Indo-Pakistani War of 1965
- Awards: Victoria Cross

Gian Singh VC (5 October 1920 – 6 October 1996) was a recipient of the Victoria Cross, the highest and most prestigious award for gallantry in the face of the enemy that can be awarded to British and Commonwealth forces.

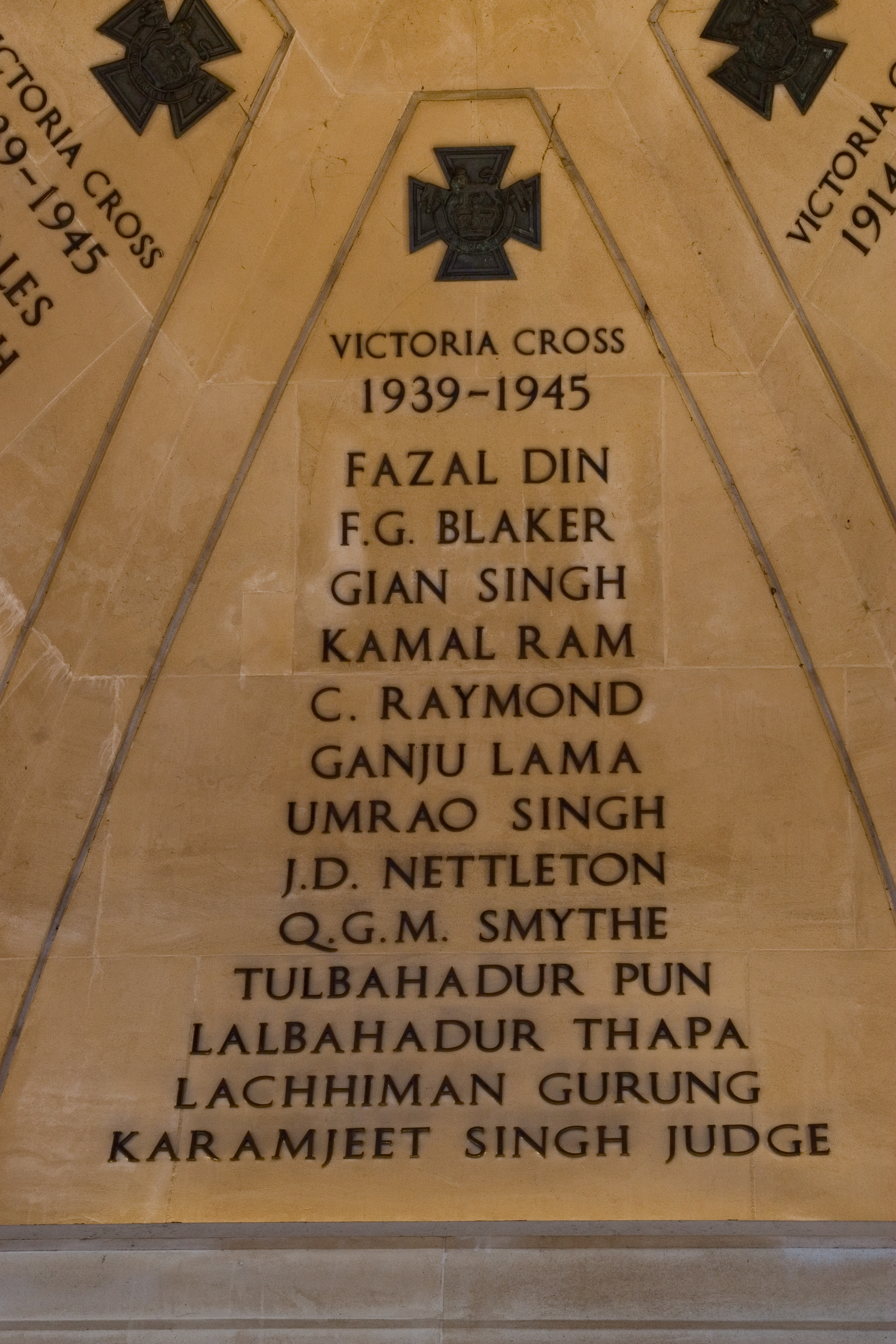
Singh's name on the "Memorial Gates" at Constitution Hill, London SW1

== Early life ==
Singh was born into a Jat Sikh family in Shahabpur (also spelt Sahabpur), a village in the Nawanshahr district (now, Shaheed Bhagat Singh Nagar district) of eastern Punjab. He enlisted in the British Indian Army in 1937.

== Details ==
He was 24 years old, and a Naik in the 15th Punjab Regiment in the British Indian Army, when during the Burma Campaign 1944–45 of World War II he performed the deeds for which he was awarded the VC. The citation reads:

The KING has been graciously pleased to approve the award of the VICTORIA CROSS to:—

No. 11620 Naik Gian SINGH, 15th Punjab Regiment, Indian Army.

In Burma, on 2nd March, 1945, the Japanese were holding a strong position astride the road Kamye-Myingyan. Two Companies of the 15th Punjab Regiment carried out successfully a wide encircling movement and established themselves on some high ground about one and a half miles in the rear of this enemy position. As all water supply points were within the enemy position it was vital that he should be dislodged.
The attack on to the first objective was successful and one platoon was ordered to attack a village to the right. This platoon's attack, with the aid of tanks, advanced slowly under very heavy enemy fire. Naik Gian Singh was in command of the leading section.
The enemy were well concealed in foxholes along cactus hedges and Naik Gian Singh soon observed enemy some twenty yards ahead. Ordering his Light Machine Gunner to cover him, he, alone, rushed the enemy fox-holes, firing his Tommy Gun. He was met by a hail of fire and wounded in the arm. In spite of this he continued his advance alone, hurling grenades. He killed several Japanese including four in one of the enemy main weapon pits.
By this time a troop of tanks moved up in support of this platoon and came under fire from a cleverly concealed enemy antitank gun. Naik Gian Singh quickly saw the danger to the tanks and, ignoring the danger to himself and in spite of his wounds, again rushed forward, killed the crew and captured the gun single-handed. His section followed him and he then led them down a lane of cactus hedges, clearing all enemy positions which were being firmly held. Some twenty enemy bodies were found in this area, the majority of which fell to Naik Gian Singh and his section.
After this action, the Company reformed to take the enemy positions to the rear.
Naik Gian Singh was ordered to the Regimental Aid Post but, in spite of his wounds, requested permission to lead his section until the whole action had been completed. This was granted.
There is no doubt that these acts of supreme gallantry saved Naik Gian Singh's platoon many casualties and enabled the whole operation to be carried out successfully with severe losses to the enemy.

The magnificent gallantry of this Naik throughout, his devotion to duty and leadership, although wounded, could not have been surpassed.

— London Gazette, 22 May 1945.

Singh received a mention in dispatches later that year. He was presented with his Victoria Cross by King George VI, in a ceremony at Buckingham Palace on 16 October 1945.

== Later life ==
Despite wounds to his leg which left him in pain until his death, Singh refused to be invalided from the Army. After Indian independence in 1947, he transferred to the 11th Sikhs when 15 Punjab was allocated to Pakistan. He regularly visited London to attend reunions of the Victoria Cross and George Cross Association. According to his son, for many years Singh never discussed the war or his VC action with his family, as he had lost all of his close friends in action.

Singh was promoted to havildar (sergeant), with successive promotions to jemadar (now naib subedar in the Indian Army) on 29 December 1955, followed by promotion to subedar on 21 December 1961. He saw action in both the 1962 Sino-Indian War and in the Indo-Pakistani War of 1965. Promoted to subedar major on 15 June 1967, Singh retired from the army in August 1969 with the honorary rank of captain. He died in 1996.

== The medal ==
Singh's medals, including his Victoria Cross, are held by his son Charanjit Sangha, who lives in Scotland.

== Awards ==

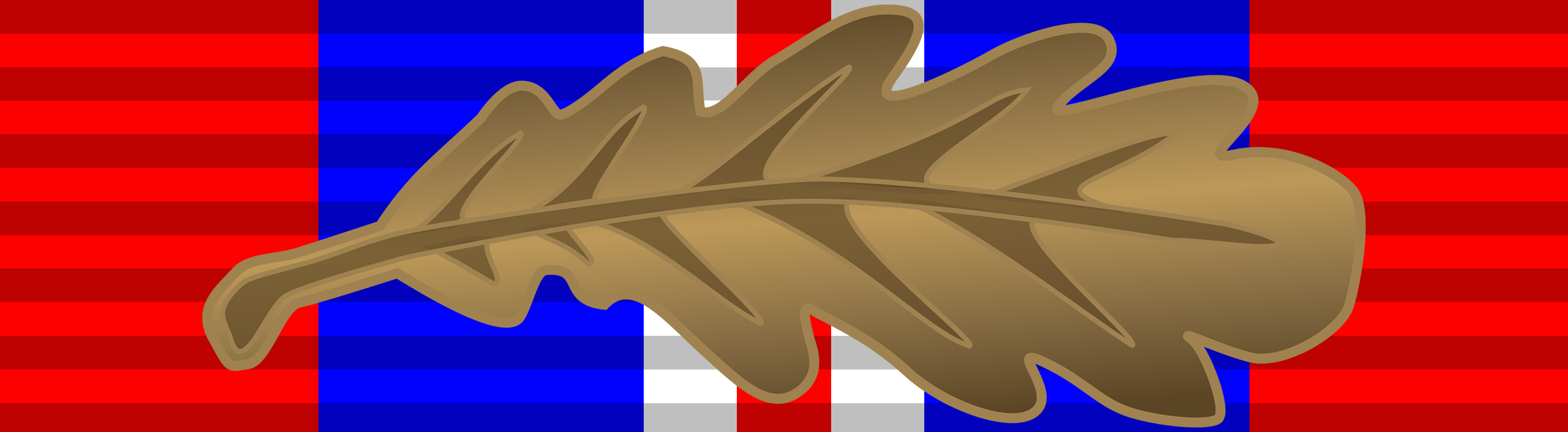

General Service Medal 1947	Samanya Seva Medal		
Samar Seva Star	Raksha Medal	Indian Independence Medal	20 Years Long Service Medal
9 Years Long Service Medal	Victoria Cross	1939–45 Star	Burma Star
War Medal 1939-1945	India Service Medal	Queen Elizabeth II Coronation Medal	Queen Elizabeth II Silver Jubilee Medal
