= Ram Rai Pur =

- Village
- Location in Punjab, India Ram Rai Pur (India)
- Coordinates: 31.1167°N 76.1333°E
- Country: India
- State: Punjab
- District: Shaheed Bhagat Singh Nagar

Area
  - Total: 3.570 km^{2} (1.378 sq mi)

Languages
  - Official: Punjabi
- Time zone: UTC+5:30 (IST)
- Vehicle registration: PB-
- Literacy: 75%
- Website: nawanshahr.nic.in

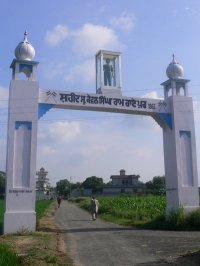
Ram Rai Pur Gate

Ram Rai Pur is a village in Shaheed Bhagat Singh Nagar district. The village is located in the eastern part of Punjab, India (31°5'12"N, 76°10'15"E). It is situated on the right bank of the Sutlej which is one of the 5 main rivers in Punjab. It is also one of the oldest villages in Punjab with a history dating back to the 17th century.

The village consists of 4 large Sikh family clans, which are represented by the Dhindsa, Dhariwal, Dharni and Jhaj clans. Some of these family members have since emigrated to places all over the world such as Canada, England, New Zealand, Australia and the United States.

The Dharni families are also known as "Sikhan de". The late Sant Sewa Singh was one of the main heads of the family and he was well respected by the whole village as well as the local politicians. The families originally came from the Bathinda district and relocated more than five decades ago. The original five families have now grown to more than twenty.

== Families ==
There are four main families in Ram Rai Pur

- Dhindsa
- Dharni
- Dhariwal
- Jhaj

== History ==
1634 AD The battle of Kartarpur was fought between Mughal troops and Guru Hargobind. The imperial troops were routed and both Painda Khan and Kala Khan were killed whilst hiding on the outskirts of Ram Rai Pur. During the rest of the 17th Century, Jalandhar remained firmly attached to the Delhi Empire. With the death of Aurangzeb in 1707 the Mughal Empire began to disintegrate.

1710 AD Katar Singh Dhariwal of Ram Rai Pur and his army received appeals from the peasants of the Jalandhar Doaba to help them against the Mughal Faujdar, Shams Khan of Jalandhar. The news of the return of Katar was enough to put heart into the Sikhs and who then rose to fight back against the Mughals. Shams Khan was defeated in Rahon.

1716 AD The capture and execution of Katar Singh Dhaliwal and his followers in the year 1716 led to the persecution of the Sikhs. The Sikhs were thought to be completely crushed, in reality they were temporarily subdued.

1807 AD Maharaja Ranjit Singh (Punjab) crossed the Sutlej and attacked the Rajput fort of Nariangarh in the Ambala district. Katar Singh Dhariwal's grandson Mohan Singh Dhariwal & Tara Singh Gheba, accompanied him; however Tara became ill and died on his way home during the siege. His death was kept secret while the body was sent in all haste to Rahon where he was from. According to J.D. Cunningham, Tara Singh Gheba's widow, Rani Rattan Kaur equalled the sister of the Raja of Patiala in spirit and she was described to have girded up her garment and fought, sword in hand. The Jalandhar Doaba had been absorbed into the dominion of Maharaja Ranjit Singh and given over to Dewan Mohkam Chand.

1846 AD John Lawrence, 1st Baron Lawrence was appointed the commission of the Jalandhar Doaba on its annexation in 1846. He put a curfew around Ram Rai Pur the heart of the Sikh uproar against the British Raj and the surrounding villages, killing any one who did not adhere to his rules. In 1847 nine members of the Dhindsa family were shot and hanged in an action to scare other villages around Ram Rai Pur.

1918 AD Mahatma Gandhi visited Ram Rai Pur He organized a detailed study and survey of the villages, accounting for the atrocities and terrible episodes of suffering, including the general state of degenerate living. Building on the confidence of villagers, he began leading the clean-up of villages, which led to the building of schools and hospitals and also encouraging the village leadership to undo and condemn many social evils, as accounted above.

1947 AD The partition of India resulted in the process that led to the creation on 14 August 1947 and 15 August 1947, respectively, of the sovereign states of Dominion of Pakistan (later Islamic Republic of Pakistan) and Union of India (later Republic of India) upon the granting of independence from the British Empire, marking the end of the British rule of India. Over 60 people men, women & children were killed leaving Ram Rai Pur going to the new Pakistan. Many more would have been killed had it not been for the help of the local village people.
