= Dhinsa =

Dhinsa is a surname. Notable people with the surname include:

- Sunny Dhinsa (born 1993), Indian-Canadian wrestler
- Gurmeet Singh Dhinsa (born 1962), Indian-American former gas station magnate and convicted murderer

== See also ==
- Dhindsa
