= Mazara Khurd =

- Village
- Location in Punjab, India Mazara Khurd (India)
- Coordinates: 31.07645°N 76.1977326°E
- Country: India
- State: Punjab
- District: Shaheed Bhagat Singh Nagar

Government
  - Type: Panchayat raj
  - Body: Gram panchayat

Population (2011)
  - Total: 488
- Sex ratio 247/241 ♂/♀

Languages
  - Official: Punjabi
- Time zone: UTC+5:30 (IST)
- PIN: 144515
- Telephone code: 01823
- ISO 3166 code: IN-PB
- Post office: Jadla (S.O)
- Website: nawanshahr.nic.in

Mazara Khurd is a village in Shaheed Bhagat Singh Nagar district of Punjab State, India. It is located 3 kilometres (1.9 mi) away from sub post office Jadla, 12 kilometres (7.5 mi) from Nawanshahr, 18 kilometres (11 mi) from district headquarter Shaheed Bhagat Singh Nagar and 82.5 kilometres (51.3 mi) from state capital Chandigarh. The village is administrated by Sarpanch an elected representative of the village.

== Demography ==
As of 2011, Mazara Khurd has a total number of 105 houses and population of 488 of which 247 include are males while 241 are females according to the report published by Census India in 2011. The literacy rate of Mazara Khurd is 74.11% lower than the state average of 75.84%. The population of children under the age of 6 years is 40 which is 8.20% of total population of Mazara Khurd, and child sex ratio is approximately 1222 as compared to Punjab state average of 846.

Most of the people are from Schedule Caste which constitutes 37.30% of total population in Mazara Khurd. The town does not have any Schedule Tribe population so far.

As per the report published by Census India in 2011, 133 people were engaged in work activities out of the total population of Mazara Khurd which includes 124 males and 9 females. According to census survey report 2011, 96.99% workers describe their work as main work and 3.01% workers are involved in Marginal activity providing livelihood for less than 6 months.

== Education ==
KC Engineering College and Doaba Khalsa Trust Group Of Institutions are the nearest colleges. Industrial Training Institute for women (ITI Nawanshahr) is 9.3 kilometres (5.8 mi). The village is 63 kilometres (39 mi) away from Chandigarh University, 40.5 kilometres (25.2 mi) from Indian Institute of Technology and 55.5 kilometres (34.5 mi) away from Lovely Professional University.

List of schools nearby:

- Dashmesh Model School, Kahma
- Govt Primary School, Kahlon
- Govt High School, Garcha

== Transport ==
Nawanshahr train station is the nearest train station however, Garhshankar Junction railway station is 22.8 kilometres (14.2 mi) away from the village. Sahnewal Airport is the nearest domestic airport which located 57 kilometres (35 mi) away in Ludhiana and the nearest international airport is located in Chandigarh also Sri Guru Ram Dass Jee International Airport is the second nearest airport which is 164 kilometres (102 mi) away in Amritsar.

== See also ==
- List of villages in India
