= Dhindsa =

Indian surname

- Jat clan
- Ethnicity: Punjabis
- Location: India
- Language: Punjabi
- Religion: Sikhism

Dhindsa, also known as Dhinsa, is an Indian surname found among Jat Sikhs of Punjab.

== Notable people ==
Notable people who bear the name, who may or may not be affiliated with the clan, include:

- Hardyal Dhindsa, English politician
- Parminder Singh Dhindsa (born 1973), Indian politician
- Satsimranjit Dhindsa (born 1991), Canadian cricketer
- Sukhdev Singh Dhindsa (born 1936), Indian politician
- Sunny Dhinsa (born 1993), WWE wrestler ring name Akam

== See also ==
- Dhinsa
