= Sajawalpur =

- Village
- Location in Punjab, India Sajawalpur (India)
- Coordinates: 31°05′40″N 76°11′04″E
- Country: India
- State: Punjab
- District: Shaheed Bhagat Singh Nagar

Government
  - Type: Panchayat raj
  - Body: Gram panchayat
- Elevation: 355 m (1,165 ft)

Population (2011)
  - Total: 1,031
- Sex ratio 531/500 ♂/♀

Languages
  - Official: Punjabi
- Time zone: UTC+5:30 (IST)
- PIN: 144516
- Telephone code: 01823
- ISO 3166 code: IN-PB
- Post office: Sanawa (B.O)
- Website: nawanshahr.nic.in

Sajawalpur is a village in Shaheed Bhagat Singh Nagar district of Punjab State, India. It is located 600 meters away from branch post office Sanawa, 8.8 kilometres (5.5 mi) from Nawanshahr, 17 kilometres (11 mi) from district headquarter Shaheed Bhagat Singh Nagar and 84 kilometres (52 mi) from state capital Chandigarh. The village is administrated by Sarpanch an elected representative of the village.

== Demography ==
As of 2011, Sajawalpur has a total number of 220 houses and population of 1031 of which 531 include are males while 500 are females according to the report published by Census India in 2011. The literacy rate of Sajawalpur is 78.93% higher than the state average of 75.84%. The population of children under the age of 6 years is 82 which is 7.85% of total population of Sajawalpur, and child sex ratio is approximately 907 as compared to Punjab state average of 846.

Most of the people are from Schedule Caste which constitutes 39.38% of total population in Sajawalpur. The town does not have any Schedule Tribe population so far.

As per the report published by Census India in 2011, 333 people were engaged in work activities out of the total population of Sajawalpur which includes 321 males and 12 females. According to census survey report 2011, 48.95% workers describe their work as main work and 51.05% workers are involved in Marginal activity providing livelihood for less than 6 months.

== Education ==
The village has no school and children either travel or walk to other villages for schooling often covering between 8 or 10 kilometres (5.0 or 6.2 mi). KC Engineering College and Doaba Khalsa Trust Group Of Institutions are the nearest colleges. Industrial Training Institute for women (ITI Nawanshahr) is 6.4 kilometres (4.0 mi). The village is 65 kilometres (40 mi) away from Chandigarh University, 42 kilometres (26 mi) from Indian Institute of Technology and 51.7 kilometres (32.1 mi) away from Lovely Professional University.

List of schools nearby:

- Govt Primary School, Sadhpur
- Govt High School, Saidpur Kalan
- Govt Senior Secondary School, Ladhana Jhikka
- Govt High School, Jhander Kalan
- Guru Ram Dass Public School, Cheta

== Transport ==
Nawanshahr train station is the nearest train station however, Garhshankar Junction railway station is 18.3 kilometres (11.4 mi) away from the village. Sahnewal Airport is the nearest domestic airport which located 59 kilometres (37 mi) away in Ludhiana and the nearest international airport is located in Chandigarh also Sri Guru Ram Dass Jee International Airport is the second nearest airport which is 161 kilometres (100 mi) away in Amritsar.

== See also ==
- List of villages in India
