= Kot Ranjha =

- Village
- Location in Punjab, India Kot Ranjha (India)
- Coordinates: 31.0702856°N 76.13976°E
- Country: India
- State: Punjab
- District: Shaheed Bhagat Singh Nagar

Government
  - Type: Panchayat raj
  - Body: Gram panchayat
- Elevation: 355 m (1,165 ft)

Population (2011)
  - Total: 1,496
- Sex ratio 772/724 ♂/♀

Languages
  - Official: Punjabi
- Time zone: UTC+5:30 (IST)
- PIN: 144517
- Telephone code: 01884
- ISO 3166 code: IN-PB
- Post office: Rahon
- Website: nawanshahr.nic.in

Kot Ranjha is a village in Shaheed Bhagat Singh Nagar district of Punjab State, India. It is located 4.8 kilometres (3.0 mi) away from postal head office Rahon, 8.9 kilometres (5.5 mi) from Nawanshahr, 13 kilometres (8.1 mi) from district headquarter Shaheed Bhagat Singh Nagar and 88 kilometres (55 mi) from state capital Chandigarh. The village is administrated by Sarpanch an elected representative of the village.

== Demography ==
As of 2011, Kot Ranjha has a total number of 296 houses and population of 1496 of which 772 include are males while 724 are females according to the report published by Census India in 2011. The literacy rate of Kot Ranjha is 77.10% higher than the state average of 75.84%. The population of children under the age of 6 years is 138 which is 9.22% of total population of Kot Ranjha, and child sex ratio is approximately 816 as compared to Punjab state average of 846.

Most of the people are from Schedule Caste which constitutes 67.31% of total population in Kot Ranjha. The town does not have any Schedule Tribe population so far.

As per the report published by Census India in 2011, 637 people were engaged in work activities out of the total population of Kot Ranjha which includes 463 males and 174 females. According to census survey report 2011, 67.50% workers describe their work as main work and 32.50% workers are involved in Marginal activity providing livelihood for less than 6 months.

== Education ==
The village has a Punjabi medium, co-ed upper primary with secondary school established in 1978. The school provide mid-day meal as per Indian Midday Meal Scheme. As per Right of Children to Free and Compulsory Education Act the school provide free education to children between the ages of 6 and 14.

Amardeep Singh Shergill Memorial college Mukandpur and Sikh National College Banga are the nearest colleges. Industrial Training Institute for women (ITI Nawanshahr) is 7.7 kilometres (4.8 mi) The village is 46.6 kilometres (29.0 mi) from Indian Institute of Technology and 53 kilometres (33 mi) away from Lovely Professional University.

== Transport ==
Nawanshahr railway station is the nearest train station however, Garhshankar Junction railway station is 20.3 kilometres (12.6 mi) away from the village. Sahnewal Airport is the nearest domestic airport which located 51 kilometres (32 mi) away in Ludhiana and the nearest international airport is located in Chandigarh also Sri Guru Ram Dass Jee International Airport is the second nearest airport which is 161 kilometres (100 mi) away in Amritsar.

== See also ==
- List of villages in India
