= Chhokran, SBS Nagar =

Chhokran
- Village
- Location in Punjab, India Chhokran (India)
- Coordinates: 31.0742668°N 76.1292081°E
- Country: India
- State: Punjab
- District: Shaheed Bhagat Singh Nagar

Government
  - Type: Panchayat raj
  - Body: Gram panchayat
- Elevation: 251 m (823 ft)

Population (2011)
  - Total: 844
- Sex ratio 409/435 ♂/♀

Languages
  - Official: Punjabi
- Time zone: UTC+5:30 (IST)
- PIN: 144514
- Telephone code: 01823
- ISO 3166 code: IN-PB
- Post office: Nawanshahr
- Website: nawanshahr.nic.in

Chhokran is a village in Shaheed Bhagat Singh Nagar district of Punjab State, India. It is located 7.7 kilometres (4.8 mi) away from postal head office Nawanshahr, 4.6 kilometres (2.9 mi) from Rahon, 13 kilometres (8.1 mi) from district headquarter Shaheed Bhagat Singh Nagar and 87 kilometres (54 mi) from state capital Chandigarh. The village is administrated by Sarpanch an elected representative of the village.

== Demography ==
As of 2011, Chhokran has a total number of 209 houses and population of 844 of which 409 include are males while 435 are females according to the report published by Census India in 2011. The literacy rate of Chhokran is 81.05%, higher than the state average of 75.84%. The population of children under the age of 6 years is 100 which is 11.85% of total population of Chhokran, and child sex ratio is approximately 1326 as compared to Punjab state average of 846.

Most of the people are from Schedule Caste which constitutes 25.83% of total population in Chhokran. The town does not have any Schedule Tribe population so far.

As per the report published by Census India in 2011, 576 people were engaged in work activities out of the total population of Chhokran which includes 275 males and 301 females. According to census survey report 2011, 94.62% workers describe their work as main work and 5.38% workers are involved in Marginal activity providing livelihood for less than 6 months.

== Education ==
The village has a Punjabi medium, co-ed primary school founded in 1955. The schools provide mid-day meal as per Indian Midday Meal Scheme and the meal prepared in school premises. As per Right of Children to Free and Compulsory Education Act the school provide free education to children between the ages of 6 and 14.

KC Engineering College and Doaba Khalsa Trust Group Of Institutions are the nearest colleges. Industrial Training Institute for women (ITI Nawanshahr) is 5 kilometres (3.1 mi) away from the village. Lovely Professional University is 52 kilometres (32 mi) away from the village.

== Transport ==
Nawanshahr railway station is the nearest train station however, Garhshankar Junction railway station is 19 kilometres (12 mi) away from the village. Sahnewal Airport is the nearest domestic airport which located 51 kilometres (32 mi) away in Ludhiana and the nearest international airport is located in Chandigarh also Sri Guru Ram Dass Jee International Airport is the second nearest airport which is 160 kilometres (99 mi) away in Amritsar.

== See also ==
- List of villages in India
