= Jadla =

- Village
- Location in Punjab, India Jadla (India)
- Coordinates: 31.0803751°N 76.2128019°E
- Country: India
- State: Punjab
- District: Shaheed Bhagat Singh Nagar

Government
  - Type: Panchayat raj
  - Body: Gram panchayat
- Elevation: 355 m (1,165 ft)

Population (2011)
  - Total: 4,442
- Sex ratio 2309/2133 ♂/♀

Languages
  - Official: Punjabi
- Time zone: UTC+5:30 (IST)
- PIN: 144515
- Telephone code: 01823
- ISO 3166 code: IN-PB
- Post office: Jadla
- Website: nawanshahr.nic.in

Jadla is a village in Shaheed Bhagat Singh Nagar district of Punjab State, India. It is located 30 kilometres (19 mi) away from postal head office Lassara, 12 kilometres (7.5 mi) from Nawanshahr, 20 kilometres (12 mi) from district headquarter Shaheed Bhagat Singh Nagar and 80 kilometres (50 mi) from state capital Chandigarh. The village is administrated by Sarpanch an elected representative of the village.

== Demography ==
As of 2011, Jadla has a total number of 895 houses and population of 4442 of which 2309 include are males while 2133 are females according to the report published by Census India in 2011. The literacy rate of Jadla is 80.39%, higher than the state average of 75.84%. The population of children under the age of 6 years is 460 which is 10.36% of total population of Jadla, and child sex ratio is approximately 847 as compared to Punjab state average of 846.

Most of the people are from Schedule Caste which constitutes 47.01% of total population in Jadla. The town does not have any Schedule Tribe population so far.

As per the report published by Census India in 2011, 1447 people were engaged in work activities out of the total population of Jadla which includes 1293 males and 154 females. According to census survey report 2011, 81.69% workers describe their work as main work and 18.31% workers are involved in Marginal activity providing livelihood for less than 6 months.

== Education ==
The village has a Punjabi medium, co-ed upper primary with secondary/higher secondary school founded in 1929. The school provide mid-day meal as per Indian Midday Meal Scheme and also provide free education to children between the ages of 6 and 14 as per Right of Children to Free and Compulsory Education Act.

KC Engineering College and Doaba Khalsa Trust Group Of Institutions are the nearest colleges. Industrial Training Institute for women (ITI Nawanshahr) is 7.5 kilometres (4.7 mi) and Lovely Professional University is 46.5 kilometres (28.9 mi) away from the village.

== Landmarks ==
Gurudwara Sahib Shiri Guru Ravidass Ji Maharaj, Gurudwara Singh Sabha, Gurudawa Shahib Shaheed Singh, Shiv Mandir and Mata Parvati Mandir, Panj Peer Darwar, are religious sites. The village has 3 banks and 4 ATM facility and Police Post. Police Post Jadla is located near Mini Bus stand Palace Road Jadla. Police Post Jadla is under The jurisdiction of Police Station Sadar Nawanshahr.

== Transport ==
Nawanshahr railway station is the nearest train station however, Garhshankar Junction railway station is 20 kilometres (12 mi) away from the village. Sahnewal Airport is the nearest domestic airport which located 59 kilometres (37 mi) away in Ludhiana and the nearest international airport is located in Chandigarh also Sri Guru Ram Dass Jee International Airport is the second nearest airport which is 165 kilometres (103 mi) away in Amritsar.

== See also ==
- List of villages in India
