= Chaheru, Phagwara =

Chaheru
- Village
- Location in Punjab, India Chaheru (India)
- Coordinates: 31.268888°N 75.701530°E
- Country: India
- State: Punjab
- District: Kapurthala

Government
  - Type: Panchayati raj (India)
  - Body: Gram panchayat

Population (2011)
  - Total: 2,458
- Sex ratio 1248/1210♂/♀

Languages
  - Official: Punjabi
  - Other spoken: Hindi
- Time zone: UTC+5:30 (IST)
- PIN: 144401
- Telephone code: 01822
- ISO 3166 code: IN-PB
- Vehicle registration: PB-09
- Website: kapurthala.gov.in

Chaheru is a village in Phagwara Tehsil in Kapurthala district of Punjab State, India. It is located 40 kilometres (25 mi) from Kapurthala, 7 kilometres (4.3 mi) from Phagwara. 128 kilometres (80 mi) from State capital Chandigarh. The village is administrated by a Sarpanch who is an elected representative of village as per the constitution of India and Panchayati raj.

== Demography ==
According to the report published by Census India in 2011, Chaheru has 509 houses with the total population of 2,458 persons of which 1,248 are male and 1,210 females. Literacy rate of Chaheru is 80.58%, higher than the state average of 75.84%. The population of children in the age group 0–6 years is 244 which is 9.93% of the total population. Child sex ratio is approximately 906, higher than the state average of 846.

== Population data ==
Particulars	Total	Male	Female
Total No. of Houses	509	-	-
Population	2,458	1,248	1,210
Child (0-6)	244	128	116
Schedule Caste	1,264	621	643
Schedule Tribe	0	0	0
Literacy	80.58 %	86.61 %	74.41 %
Total Workers	781	667	114
Main Worker	738	0	0
Marginal Worker	43	26	17

== Transport ==
Phagwara Junction Railway Station, Mauli Halt Railway Station are nearby railway stations to Chachoki. Jalandhar City Railway Station is 24 km away from the village. The village is 119 km away from Sri Guru Ram Dass Jee International Airport in Amritsar. Another nearby airport is Sahnewal Airport in Ludhiana which is located 38 km away from the village.
