= Bhar Singh Pura =

- Village
- Location in Punjab, India Bhar Singh Pura (India)
- Coordinates: 31.0591164°N 75.8696561°E
- Country: India
- State: Punjab
- District: Jalandhar
- Tehsil: Phillaur

Government
  - Type: Panchayat raj
  - Body: Gram panchayat
- Elevation: 246 m (807 ft)

Population (2011)
  - Total: 1,845
- Sex ratio 893/952 ♂/♀

Languages
  - Official: Punjabi
- Time zone: UTC+5:30 (IST)
- PIN: 144419
- Telephone code: 01826
- ISO 3166 code: IN-PB
- Vehicle registration: PB 37
- Post office: Dayalpur
- Website: jalandhar.nic.in

Bhar Singh Pura is a village in Phillaur tehsil of Jalandhar District of Punjab State, India. It is located 10 km away from Phillaur. It is one of the medium-sized villages in Punjab. Almost one-third of the population of this village lives abroad. The outskirts of the village are lined with designers Kothies (Big Houses) built by the NRIs, who have a silent competition to show their worth. There is a full site of this village on Facebook. A number of people from this village have achieved remarkable positions in India as well abroad. NRIs have made a full-fledged gym in the village for the youth. The village has a Senior Secondary school and a good private-public school (Everlasting Convent School).

== Caste ==
The main castes in this village are Jats, Harijans, Goldsmith, Brahman, and Weavers etc. The village has schedule caste (SC) constitutes 60.22% of total population of the village and it doesn't have any Schedule Tribe (ST) population.

== Famous people ==
- Surinder Singh Nijjar (Judge of the Supreme Court of India).
- Hardeep Singh Nijjar, a Canadian Sikh separatist leader involved with the Khalistan movement who was assassinated on 18 June 2023.

== Nearby villages ==
- Apra
- Bansian
- Nagar
- Thalla
- Sultanpur
- Raipur
- Dayalpur
