= Bhangali =

Coordinates: 30°54′N 74°51′E

- Village
- Location in Punjab, India Bhangali (India)
- Country: India
- State: Punjab
- District: Jalandhar
- Tehsil: Phillaur

Government
  - Type: Panchayat raj
  - Body: Gram panchayat

Area
  - Total: 84 ha (210 acres)

Population (2011)
  - Total: 11; 4/7 ♂/♀
  - Scheduled Castes: 0; 0/0 ♂/♀
  - Total Households: 2

Languages
  - Official: Punjabi
- Time zone: UTC+5:30 (IST)
- Telephone: 01826
- ISO 3166 code: IN-PB
- Vehicle registration: PB-37
- Website: jalandhar.gov.in

Bhangali is a village in Phillaur in Jalandhar district of Punjab State, India. It is located 6 kilometres (3.7 mi) from sub district headquarter and 32 kilometres (20 mi) from district headquarter. The village is administrated by Sarpanch an elected representative of the village.

== Demography ==
As of 2011, the village has a total number of 2 houses and a population of 11 of which 4 are males while 7 are females. According to the report published by Census India in 2011, out of the total population of the village 0 people are from Schedule Caste and the village does not have any Schedule Tribe population so far.

== See also ==
- List of villages in India
