= Kang Jagir =

Kang Jagir(ਕੰਗ ਜਾਗੀਰ)
- Village
- Location in Punjab, India Kang Jagir(ਕੰਗ ਜਾਗੀਰ) (India)
- Coordinates: 31.0846659°N 75.8212906°E
- Country: India
- State: Punjab
- District: Jalandhar
- Tehsil: Phillaur
- Elevation: 246 m (807 ft)

Population (2011)
  - Total: 1,260
- Sex ratio 613/647 ♂/♀

Languages
  - Official: Punjabi
  - Other spoken: Hindi
- Time zone: UTC+5:30 (IST)
- PIN: 144418
- Telephone code: 01826
- ISO 3166 code: IN-PB
- Vehicle registration: PB 37
- Post office: Bara Pind
- Website: jalandhar.nic.in

Kang Jagir ਕੰਗ ਜਾਗੀਰ is a medium size village in Phillaur tehsil of Jalandhar District of Punjab State, India. The village is administrated by Sarpanch who is elected representative of the village. It is 2.4 kilometres (1.5 miles) away from Jajja Khurd and 5.5 kilometres (3.4 miles) away from a main market place in the census town Apra. Kang Jagir has its closest postal head office 5.1 kilometres (3.2 miles) away in Bara Pind. The village is 50 kilometres (31 miles) east of Jalandhar, 11.7 kilometres (7.3 miles) from Phillaur and 124 kilometres (77 miles) away from the state capital Chandigarh.

== Caste ==
The village has schedule caste (SC) constitutes 48.17% of total population of the village and it doesn't have any Schedule Tribe (ST) population.

== Education ==
The village has a Punjabi Medium, Co-educational primary school (Govt. Primary School) and a senior secondary school (Shaheed Baba Deep Singh Senior secondary school). The nearest government high school is located in Apra.

== Landmarks ==
The village has a famous Gurudwara Bhai Bala Sahib Ji which is located at the east entrance of the village and Guru Ravidas Ji Gurudwara which is located at the western side of the village. The village also has a Hindu temple.

The village does not have any bank or ATM facility and villagers have to travel to Apra.

== Transport ==
=== Rail ===
The nearest train station is situated 10.4 kilometres (6.5 miles) away in Goraya and Ludhiana Jn Railway Station is 27.5 kilometres (17.1 miles) away from the village.

=== Air ===
The nearest domestic airport is at Ludhiana which is 40 kilometres (25 miles) away from Kang Jagir. The nearest international airport is located in Chandigarh and a second nearest international airport is 137 kilometres (85 miles) away in Amritsar.
