= Bajar =

- Village
- Location in Punjab, India Bajar (India)
- Coordinates: 31°01′30″N 75°50′09″E
- Country: India
- State: Punjab
- District: Jalandhar
- Tehsil: Phillaur

Government
  - Type: Panchayat raj
  - Body: Gram panchayat

Area
  - Total: 91.49 ha (226.1 acres)

Population (2011)
  - Total: 86; 48/38 ♂/♀
  - Scheduled Castes: 16; 10/6 ♂/♀
  - Total Households: 18

Languages
  - Official: Punjabi
- Time zone: UTC+5:30 (IST)
- Telephone: 01826
- ISO 3166 code: IN-PB
- Vehicle registration: PB-37
- Website: jalandhar.gov.in

Bajar is a village in Phillaur in Jalandhar district of Punjab State, India. It is located 5 kilometres (3.1 mi) from sub district headquarter and 51 kilometres (32 mi) from district headquarter. The village is administrated by Sarpanch an elected representative of the village.

== Demography ==
As of 2011, the village has a total number of 18 houses and a population of 86 of which 48 are males while 38 are females. According to the report published by Census India in 2011, out of the total population of the village 16 people are from Schedule Caste and the village does not have any Schedule Tribe population so far.

== See also ==
- List of villages in India
