= Moron, Punjab =

Moron
- Village
- Location in Punjab, India Moron (India)
- Coordinates: 31.0846917°N 75.9158386°E
- Country: India
- State: Punjab
- District: Jalandhar
- Tehsil: Phillaur
- Elevation: 246 m (807 ft)

Population (2011)
  - Total: 1,987
- Sex ratio 955/1032 ♂/♀

Languages
  - Official: Punjabi
  - Other spoken: Hindi
- Time zone: UTC+5:30 (IST)
- PIN: 144029
- Telephone code: 01826
- ISO 3166 code: IN-PB
- Vehicle registration: PB 37
- Post office: Moron
- Website: jalandhar.nic.in

Moron, also known as Morran, is a village in Phillaur tehsil of Jalandhar District of Punjab State, India. The village is administrated by a Sarpanch who is the elected representative of the village. It is located 4.2 km away from census town Apra and 1 km from Chhokran. It is located 47 km away from Jalandhar, 17 km from Phillaur and 120 km from Chandigarh. The nearest train station is situated 17 km away in Phillaur, the nearest domestic airport is at Ludhiana and the nearest international airport is 141 km away in Amritsar. The village has a postal head office.

== Caste ==
The village has schedule caste (SC) constitutes 54.96% of total population of the village and it doesn't have any Schedule Tribe (ST) population.

== Education ==
The village has a Punjabi Medium, Co-educational Upper Primary with Secondary and Higher Secondary School (GSSS Moron School) which was established in the year 1994. The school has a playground, library and also provides meals. The other nearest school is 4.2 km away in Apra.
