= Salkiana =

- Village
- Location in Punjab, India Salkiana (India)
- Coordinates: 31°02′37″N 75°54′31″E
- Country: India
- State: Punjab
- District: Jalandhar
- Tehsil: Phillaur

Government
  - Type: Panchayat raj
  - Body: Gram panchayat

Area
  - Total: 360 ha (890 acres)

Population (2011)
  - Total: 1,410; 734/676 ♂/♀
  - Scheduled Castes: 1,190; 627/563 ♂/♀
  - Total Households: 276

Languages
  - Official: Punjabi
- Time zone: UTC+5:30 (IST)
- Telephone: 01826
- ISO 3166 code: IN-PB
- Vehicle registration: PB-37
- Website: jalandhar.gov.in

Salkiana is a village in Phillaur in Jalandhar district of Punjab State, India. It is located 12 kilometres (7.5 mi) from sub district headquarter and 62 kilometres (39 mi) from district headquarter. The village is administrated by Sarpanch an elected representative of the village.

== Demography ==
As of 2011, the village has a total number of 276 houses and a population of 1410 of which 734 are males while 676 are females. According to the report published by Census India in 2011, out of the total population of the village 1190 people are from Schedule Caste and the village does not have any Schedule Tribe population so far.

== See also ==
- List of villages in India
