= Mainwal =

- Village
- Country: India
- State: Punjab
- District: Jalandhar
- Tehsil: Phillaur

Government
  - Type: Panchayat raj
  - Body: Gram panchayat

Area
  - Total: 688 ha (1,700 acres)

Population (2011)
  - Total: 1,963; 981/982 ♂/♀
  - Scheduled Castes: 1,248; 627/621 ♂/♀
  - Total Households: 412

Languages
  - Official: Punjabi
- Time zone: UTC+5:30 (IST)
- Telephone: 01826
- ISO 3166 code: IN-PB
- Vehicle registration: PB-37
- Website: jalandhar.gov.in

Mainwal is a village in Phillaur in Jalandhar district of Punjab State, India. It is located 8 kilometres (5.0 mi) from sub district headquarter and 40 kilometres (25 mi) from district headquarter. The village is administrated by Sarpanch an elected representative of the village.

== Demography ==
As of 2011, the village has a total number of 412 houses and a population of 1963 of which 981 are males while 982 are females. According to the report published by Census India in 2011, out of the total population of the village 1248 people are from Schedule Caste and the village does not have any Schedule Tribe population so far.

== See also ==
- List of villages in India
