= Pawahri =

Pawahri Powari
- Village
- Location in Punjab, India Pawahri (India)
- Coordinates: 31°02′26″N 75°55′02″E
- Country: India
- State: Punjab
- District: Jalandhar
- Tehsil: Phillaur

Government
  - Type: Panchayat raj
  - Body: Gram panchayat

Area
  - Total: 210 ha (520 acres)

Population (2011)
  - Total: 590; 302/288 ♂/♀
  - Scheduled Castes: 509; 259/250 ♂/♀
  - Total Households: 116

Languages
  - Official: Punjabi
- Time zone: UTC+5:30 (IST)
- Telephone: 01826
- ISO 3166 code: IN-PB
- Vehicle registration: PB-37
- Website: jalandhar.gov.in

Pawahri is a village in Phillaur in Jalandhar district of Punjab State, India. It is located 20 kilometres (12 mi) from sub district headquarter and 62 kilometres (39 mi) from district headquarter. The village is administrated by Sarpanch an elected representative of the village.

== Demography ==
As of 2011, the village has a total number of 116 houses and a population of 590 of which 302 are males while 288 are females. According to the report published by Census India in 2011, out of the total population of the village 509 people are from Schedule Caste and the village does not have any Schedule Tribe population so far.

== See also ==
- List of villages in India
