= Sangatpur, Jalandhar =

Sangatpur
- Village
- Country: India
- State: Punjab
- District: Jalandhar
- Tehsil: Phillaur

Government
  - Type: Panchayat raj
  - Body: Gram panchayat

Area
  - Total: 201 ha (500 acres)

Population (2011)
  - Total: 1,076; 533/543 ♂/♀
  - Scheduled Castes: 600; 294/306 ♂/♀
  - Total Households: 212

Languages
  - Official: Punjabi
- Time zone: UTC+5:30 (IST)
- Telephone: 01826
- ISO 3166 code: IN-PB
- Vehicle registration: PB-37
- Website: jalandhar.gov.in

Sangatpur is a village in Phillaur in Jalandhar district of Punjab State, India. It is located 11 kilometres (6.8 mi) from sub district headquarter and 51 kilometres (32 mi) from district headquarter. The village is administrated by Sarpanch an elected representative of the village.

== Demography ==
As of 2011, the village has a total number of 212 houses and a population of 1076 of which 533 are males while 543 are females. According to the report published by Census India in 2011, out of the total population of the village 600 people are from Schedule Caste and the village does not have any Schedule Tribe population so far.

== See also ==
- List of villages in India
