= Haripur, Phillaur =

Haripur
- Village
- Country: India
- State: Punjab
- District: Jalandhar
- Tehsil: Phillaur

Government
  - Type: Panchayat raj
  - Body: Gram panchayat

Area
  - Total: 412 ha (1,020 acres)

Population (2011)
  - Total: 1,929; 978/951 ♂/♀
  - Scheduled Castes: 1,130; 570/560 ♂/♀
  - Total Households: 409

Languages
  - Official: Punjabi
- Time zone: UTC+5:30 (IST)
- Telephone: 01826
- ISO 3166 code: IN-PB
- Vehicle registration: PB-37
- Website: jalandhar.gov.in

Haripur is a village in Phillaur in Jalandhar district of Punjab State, India. It is located 5 kilometres (3.1 mi) from sub district headquarter and 50 kilometres (31 mi) from district headquarter. The village is administrated by Sarpanch an elected representative of the village.

== Demography ==
As of 2011, the village has a total number of 409 houses and a population of 1929 of which 978 are males while 951 are females. According to the report published by Census India in 2011, out of the total population of the village 1130 people are from Schedule Caste and the village does not have any Schedule Tribe population so far.

== See also ==
- List of villages in India
