= Mowai =

- Village
- Location in Punjab, India Mowai (India)
- Coordinates: 31.0656584°N 75.6748472°E
- Country: India
- State: Punjab
- District: Jalandhar

Government
  - Type: Panchayat raj
  - Body: Gram panchayat
- Elevation: 240 m (790 ft)

Population (2011)
  - Total: 831
- Sex ratio 418/413 ♂/♀

Languages
  - Official: Punjabi
- Time zone: UTC+5:30 (IST)
- PIN: 144036
- ISO 3166 code: IN-PB
- Vehicle registration: PB- 08
- Website: jalandhar.nic.in

Mowai is a village in Jalandhar district of Punjab State, India. It is located 13 km from Phillaur, 45 km from district headquarter Jalandhar and 124 km from state capital Chandigarh. The village is administrated by a sarpanch who is an elected representative of village as per Panchayati raj (India).

== Demography ==
According to the report published by Census India in 2011, Mowai has a total number of 189 houses and population of 831 of which include 418 males and 413 females. Literacy rate of Mowai is 72.32%, lower than state average of 75.84%. The population of children under the age of 6 years is 58 which is 6.98% of total population of Mowai, and child sex ratio is approximately 933 higher than state average of 846.

Most of the people are from Schedule Caste which constitutes 34.66% of total population in Mowai. The town does not have any Schedule Tribe population so far.

As per census 2011, 277 people were engaged in work activities out of the total population of Mowai which includes 239 males and 38 females. According to census survey report 2011, 86.64% workers describe their work as main work and 13.36% workers are involved in marginal activity providing livelihood for less than 6 months.

== Transport ==
Bilga railway station is the nearest train station at only 1.5 km. And second Partabpura railway station is the nearest train station however, Phillaur Junction train station is 12.8 km away from the village. The village is 44 km away from domestic airport in Ludhiana and the nearest international airport is located in Chandigarh. Sri Guru Ram Dass Jee International Airport is the second nearest airport which is 138 km away in Amritsar. Mowai has its own small bus stand from where you can take direct busses to Delhi and other cities.
