= Bharuwal =

- Village
- Location in Punjab, India Bharuwal (India)
- Coordinates: 31°04′59″N 75°41′06″E
- Country: India
- State: Punjab
- District: Jalandhar
- Tehsil: Phillaur

Government
  - Type: Panchayat raj
  - Body: Gram panchayat

Area
  - Total: 79 ha (200 acres)

Population (2011)
  - Total: 312; 146/166 ♂/♀
  - Scheduled Castes: 243; 110/133 ♂/♀
  - Total Households: 67

Languages
  - Official: Punjabi
- Time zone: UTC+5:30 (IST)
- Telephone: 01826
- ISO 3166 code: IN-PB
- Vehicle registration: PB-37
- Website: jalandhar.gov.in

Bharuwal is a village in Phillaur in Jalandhar district of Punjab State, India. It is located 13 kilometres (8.1 mi) from sub district headquarter and 40 kilometres (25 mi) from district headquarter. The village is administrated by Sarpanch an elected representative of the village.

== Demography ==
As of 2011, the village has a total number of 67 houses and a population of 312 of which 146 are males while 166 are females. According to the report published by Census India in 2011, out of the total population of the village 243 people are from Schedule Caste and the village does not have any Schedule Tribe population so far.

== See also ==
- List of villages in India
