= Daduwal =

- Village
- Location in Punjab, India Daduwal (India)
- Coordinates: 31.2072128°N 75.6678186°E
- Country: India
- State: Punjab
- District: Jalandhar
- Tehsil: Phillaur

Government
  - Type: Panchayat raj
  - Body: Gram panchayat
- Elevation: 246 m (807 ft)

Population (2011)
  - Total: 3,144
- Sex ratio 1576/1568 ♂/♀

Languages
  - Official: Punjabi
- Time zone: UTC+5:30 (IST)
- PIN: 144032
- Telephone: 01824
- ISO 3166 code: IN-PB
- Vehicle registration: PB- 08
- Website: jalandhar.nic.in

Daduwal is a village in Phillaur tehsil in Jalandhar district of Punjab State, India. It is located 12 km away from Phagwara, 36 km from Phillaur, 20.2 km from district headquarter Jalandhar and 140 km from state capital Chandigarh. The village is administrated by a sarpanch who is an elected representative of village as per Panchayati raj (India).

== Education ==
The village has a Punjabi medium, co-education upper primary with secondary/higher secondary school (GSSS Daduwal). The school provides mid-day meal as per Indian Midday Meal Scheme and the meal prepared in school premises. The school was founded in 1975.

== Demography ==
As of 2011, Daduwal has a total number of 635 houses and a population of 3144 of which 1576 are males while 1568 are females according to the report published by Census India in 2011. Literacy rate of Daduwal is 76.51%, higher than the state average of 75.84%. The population of children under the age of 6 years is 309 which is 9.83% of the total population of Daduwal, and the child sex ratio is approximately 981, which is higher than the state average of 846.

Most of the people are from Schedule Caste which constitutes 61.77% of the total population in Daduwal. The village does not have any Schedule Tribe population so far.

A lot of people associated with this village are settled abroad in Canada, the USA, UK, and other European countries.

As per census 2011, 1015 people were engaged in work activities out of the total population of Daduwal which includes 915 males and 11 females. According to census survey report 2011, 98.33% workers describe their work as main work and 1.67% workers are involved in marginal activity providing a livelihood for less than 6 months.

== Transport ==
Phagwara Junction railway station is the nearest train station; however, Goraya train station is 16 km away from the village. The village is 65.7 km away from domestic airport in Ludhiana and the nearest international airport is located in Chandigarh also Sri Guru Ram Dass Jee International Airport is the second nearest airport which is 116 km away in Amritsar.
