= Aujla =

- Village
- Location in Punjab, India Aujla (India)
- Coordinates: 31°03′11″N 75°40′42″E
- Country: India
- State: Punjab
- District: Jalandhar
- Tehsil: Phillaur

Government
  - Type: Panchayat raj
  - Body: Gram panchayat

Area
  - Total: 281 ha (690 acres)

Population (2011)
  - Total: 1,693; 869/824 ♂/♀
  - Scheduled Castes: 770; 413/357 ♂/♀
  - Total Households: 337

Languages
  - Official: Punjabi
- Time zone: UTC+5:30 (IST)
- Telephone: 01826
- ISO 3166 code: IN-PB
- Vehicle registration: PB-37
- Website: jalandhar.gov.in

Aujla is a village in Phillaur in Jalandhar district of Punjab State, India. It is located 14 kilometres (8.7 mi) from subdistrict headquarters and 35 kilometres (22 mi) from district headquarters. The village is administrated by Sarpanch, an elected representative of the village.

== Demography ==
As of 2011, the village had a total number of 337 houses and a population of 1693, which included 869 males and 824 females. According to the report published by Census India in 2011, out of the total population of the village, 770 people are from Schedule Caste and the village does not have any Schedule Tribe population so far.

== See also ==
- List of villages in India
- Aujla Jogi
