= Fatehgarh Nihal =

- Village
- Location in Punjab, India Fatehgarh Nihal (India)
- Coordinates: 30°59′08.18″N 75°39′39.93″E
- Country: India
- State: Punjab
- District: Jalandhar
- Tehsil: Phillaur

Government
  - Type: Panchayat raj
  - Body: Gram panchayat

Area
  - Total: 44 ha (110 acres)

Population (2011)
  - Total: 142; 75/67 ♂/♀
  - Total Households: 26

Languages
  - Official: Punjabi
- Time zone: UTC+5:30 (IST)
- Telephone: 01826
- ISO 3166 code: IN-PB
- Vehicle registration: PB-37
- Website: jalandhar.gov.in

Fatehgarh Nihal is a village in Phillaur in Jalandhar district of Punjab State, India. It is located 15 kilometres (9.3 mi) from sub district headquarter and 47 kilometres (29 mi) from district headquarter. The village is administrated by Sarpanch an elected representative of the village.

== Demography ==
As of 2011, the village has a total number of 26 houses and a population of 142 of which 75 are males while 67 are females. According to the report published by Census India in 2011, the village does not have any Schedule Caste or Schedule Tribe population so far.

== See also ==
- List of villages in India
