= Gursian Nihal =

Gursian Nihal Gorsian Nihal
- Village
- Location in Punjab, India Gursian Nihal (India)
- Coordinates: 31°01′36″N 75°34′46″E
- Country: India
- State: Punjab
- District: Jalandhar
- Tehsil: Phillaur

Government
  - Type: Panchayat raj
  - Body: Gram panchayat

Area
  - Total: 403 ha (1,000 acres)

Population (2011)
  - Total: 733; 376/357 ♂/♀
  - Scheduled Castes: 367; 188/179 ♂/♀
  - Total Households: 139

Languages
  - Official: Punjabi
- Time zone: UTC+5:30 (IST)
- Telephone: 01826
- ISO 3166 code: IN-PB
- Vehicle registration: PB-37
- Website: jalandhar.gov.in

Gursian Nihal is a village in Phillaur in Jalandhar district of Punjab State, India. It is located 10 kilometres (6.2 mi) from sub-district headquarters and 33 kilometres (21 mi) from district headquarters. The village is administrated by sarpanch, an elected representative of the village.

== Demography ==
As of 2011, the village has 139 houses and a population of 733, of which 376 are males and 357 are females. According to the report published by Census India in 2011, out of the total population of the village, 367 people are from the Scheduled Caste, and the village does not have any Scheduled Tribe population so far.

== See also ==
- List of villages in India
