= Kadiana (village) =

- Village
- Location in Punjab, India Kadiana (India)
- Coordinates: 31.0257927°N 75.8707828°E
- Country: India
- State: Punjab
- District: Jalandhar
- Tehsil: Phillaur

Government
  - Type: Panchayat raj
  - Body: Gram panchayat
- Elevation: 246 m (807 ft)

Population (2011)
  - Total: 1,564

Languages
  - Official: Punjabi
- Time zone: UTC+5:30 (IST)
- PIN: 144413
- Telephone code: 01826
- ISO 3166 code: IN-PB
- Vehicle registration: PB 37
- Post office: Passi Nagar
- Website: jalandhar.nic.in

Kadiana (or Kariana) is a medium size village in Phillaur tehsil of Jalandhar District of Punjab State, India. It is located 4.4 km (2.7 mi) from Nagar, 10 km (6.2 mi) from Phillaur, 55 km (34 mi) from Jalandhar and 117 km (73 mi) from state capital Chandigarh. The village is administrated by a sarpanch who is an elected representative of village as per Panchayati raj (India).

== Education ==
The village has a Punjabi medium, Co-educational primary school (GPS Kadiana School) founded in 1967. The schools provide mid-day meal as per Indian Midday Meal Scheme and the meal prepared in school premises.

== Transport ==
=== Rail ===
Phillaur Junction is the nearest train station. However, Bhatian Railway Station is 17 km (11 mi) away from the village.

=== Air ===
The nearest domestic airport is located 43 km (27 mi) away in Ludhiana and the nearest international airport is located in Chandigarh also a second nearest international airport is 150 km (93 mi) away in Amritsar.
