= Bansian =

- Village
- Location in Punjab, India Bansian (India)
- Coordinates: 31.047893°N 75.8715901°E
- Country: India
- State: Punjab
- District: Jalandhar
- Tehsil: Phillaur

Government
  - Type: Panchayat raj
  - Body: Gram panchayat
- Elevation: 246 m (807 ft)

Population (2011)
  - Total: 729
- Sex ratio 379/350 ♂/♀

Languages
  - Official: Punjabi
- Time zone: UTC+5:30 (IST)
- Telephone code: 01826
- ISO 3166 code: IN-PB
- Vehicle registration: PB 37
- Website: jalandhar.nic.in

Bansian or Banssian, is a medium-size village in Phillaur tehsil of Jalandhar District of Punjab State, India. It is situated on Phillaur-Nawanshahr Road and located 4.6 km from Nagar, 11.5 km from Phillaur, 54 km from Jalandhar and 115 km from state capital Chandigarh. The village is administrated by a sarpanch who is an elected representative of the village as per Panchayati raj (India).

== Transport ==
=== Rail ===
Phillaur Junction is the nearest train station; however, Bhatian Railway Station is 17 km away from the village.

=== Air ===
The nearest domestic airport is located 42 km away in Ludhiana and the nearest international airport is located in Chandigarh also a second nearest international airport is 149 km away in Amritsar.
