= Chak Dhotran =

Chak Dhothar
- Village
- Location in Punjab, India Chak Dhothar (India)
- Coordinates: 31.1341089°N 75.760324°E
- Country: India
- State: Punjab
- District: Jalandhar

Government
  - Type: Panchayat raj
  - Body: Gram panchayat
- Elevation: 246 m (807 ft)

Population (2011)
  - Total: 573
- Sex ratio 294/279 ♂/♀

Languages
  - Official: Punjabi
- Time zone: UTC+5:30 (IST)
- PIN: 144409
- ISO 3166 code: IN-PB
- Vehicle registration: PB- 08
- Website: jalandhar.nic.in

Chak Dhothar is a village in Jalandhar district of Punjab State, India. It is located 18.4 km away from Phagwara, 17 km from Phillaur, 38.5 km from district headquarter Jalandhar and 125 km from state capital Chandigarh. The village is administrated by a sarpanch who is an elected representative of village as per Panchayati raj (India).

== Demography ==
As of 2011, Chak Dhothar has a total number of 118 houses and population of 573 of which 294 are males while 279 are females according to the report published by Census India in 2011. Literacy rate of Chak Dhothar is 84.18%, higher than state average of 86.83%. The population of children under the age of 6 years is 72 which is 12.57% of total population of Chak Dhothar, and child sex ratio is approximately 895 higher than state average of 846.

Most of the people are from Schedule Caste which constitutes 53.23% of total population in Begampur. The town does not have any Schedule Tribe population so far.

As per census 2011, 168 people were engaged in work activities out of the total population of Chak Dhothar which includes 164 males and 4 females. According to census survey report 2011, 99.40% workers describe their work as main work and 0.60% workers are involved in marginal activity providing livelihood for less than 6 months.

== Transport ==
=== Rail ===
Phagwara Junction is the nearest train station however, Goraya Railway Station is only 2.4 km away from the village.

=== Air ===
The nearest domestic airport is located 31 km away in Ludhiana and the nearest international airport is located in Chandigarh also Sri Guru Ram Dass Jee International Airport is the second nearest airport which is 135 km away in Amritsar.
