= Bhandal Sahib Rai =

- Village
- Location in Punjab, India Bhandal Sahib Rai (India)
- Coordinates: 31°04′08.78″N 75°34′45.00″E
- Country: India
- State: Punjab
- District: Jalandhar
- Tehsil: Phillaur

Government
  - Type: Panchayat raj
  - Body: Gram panchayat

Area
  - Total: 112 ha (280 acres)

Population (2011)
  - Total: 80; 42/38 ♂/♀
  - Scheduled Castes: 0; 0/0 ♂/♀
  - Total Households: 15

Languages
  - Official: Punjabi
- Time zone: UTC+5:30 (IST)
- Telephone: 01826
- ISO 3166 code: IN-PB
- Vehicle registration: PB-37
- Website: jalandhar.gov.in

Bhandal Sahib Rai is a village in Phillaur in Jalandhar district of Punjab State, India. It is located 19 kilometres (12 mi) from sub district headquarter and 28 kilometres (17 mi) from district headquarter. The village is administrated by Sarpanch an elected representative of the village.

== Demography ==
As of 2011, the village has a total number of 15 houses and a population of 80 of which 42 are males while 38 are females. According to the report published by Census India in 2011, out of the total population of the village 0 people are from Schedule Caste and the village does not have any Schedule Tribe population so far.

== See also ==
- List of villages in India
