= Sailkiyana =

- Village
- Location in Punjab, India Sailkiyana (India)
- Coordinates: 31.0439559°N 75.9065071°E
- Country: India
- State: Punjab
- District: Jalandhar
- Tehsil: Phillaur

Government
  - Type: Panchayat raj
  - Body: Gram panchayat
- Elevation: 246 m (807 ft)

Population (2011)
  - Total: 1,410
- Sex ratio 734/676 ♂/♀

Languages
  - Official: Punjabi
- Time zone: UTC+5:30 (IST)
- PIN: 144419
- Telephone code: 01826
- ISO 3166 code: IN-PB
- Vehicle registration: PB 37
- Post office: Dayalpur
- Website: jalandhar.nic.in

Sailkiyana or Salkiana is a medium size village in Phillaur tehsil of Jalandhar District of Punjab State, India. It is situated on Phillaur Nawanshahr Road and located 6.7 km from Nagar, 13.7 km from Phillaur, 56.9 km from Jalandhar and 108 km from state capital Chandigarh. Sailkiyana has postal head office in Dayalpur which is 2 km away from the village. The village is administrated by a sarpanch who is an elected representative of village as per Panchayati raj (India).

== Caste ==
The village has schedule caste (SC) constitutes 84.40% of total population of the village and it doesn't have any Schedule Tribe (ST) population.

== Education ==
The village has a Punjabi Medium, Co-educational Upper Primary school (GMS Sailkiyana). The school provide mid-day meal as per Indian Midday Meal Scheme and the meal prepared in school premises. The school was founded in 1996.

== Transport ==
=== Rail ===
Phillaur Junction is the nearest train station which is situated 13.6 km away; however, Goraya Railway Station is 24 km away from the village.

=== Air ===
The nearest domestic airport is located 44 km away in Ludhiana and the nearest international airport is located in Chandigarh also a second nearest international airport is 148 km away in Amritsar.
