= Kadian (disambiguation) =

Kadian is a formulation of morphine.

Kadian may also refer to:

- Satyawart Kadian (born 1993), Indian wrestler
- Kadian (Ludhiana West), village located in Ludhiana district, Punjab
- Kadian, a 1971 Hindi novel by Indian writer Bhisham Sahni

== See also ==
- Qadian, a city in Punjab, India
  - Qadian Assembly constituency
  - Qadian railway station
  - Qadiani, a religious slur for followers of the Ahmadiyya movement (which originates from the city)
- Qadian, Jalandhar, a village in Punjab, India
