= Haripur Khalsa =

- village
- Location in Punjab, India Haripur Khalsa (India)
- Coordinates: 31.04°N 75.74°E
- Country: India
- State: Punjab
- District: Jalandhar
- Elevation: 234 m (768 ft)

Population (1991)
  - Total: 1,821

Languages
  - Official: Punjabi
- Time zone: UTC+5:30 (IST)

Haripur Khalsa is a village in the Jalandhar district of Punjab state of India

- Main Road (Nearest): Phillaur-Nurmahal 14 km
- Railway Station (Nearest): Partabpura 2 km
- Development Bock: Phillaur
- Tehsils: Jalandhar-1, Jalandhar-2, Nakodar, Phillaur, Shahpur
- Sub Tehsils: Adampur, Bhogpur, Kartarpur, Nur Mahal

== Prominent figures from Haripur Khalsa ==
- Balbir Singh, Sr.
