= Bainapur =

- Village
- Location in Punjab, India Bainapur (India)
- Coordinates: 31.1260031°N 75.6075252°E
- Country: India
- State: Punjab
- District: Jalandhar
- Tehsil: Phillaur

Government
  - Type: Panchayat raj
  - Body: Gram panchayat
- Elevation: 246 m (807 ft)

Population (2011)
  - Total: 200
- Sex ratio 92/108 ♂/♀

Languages
  - Official: Punjabi
- Time zone: UTC+5:30 (IST)
- PIN: 144034
- Telephone code: 01826
- ISO 3166 code: IN-PB
- Vehicle registration: PB 37
- Website: jalandhar.nic.in

Bainapur is a small size village in Phillaur tehsil of Jalandhar district of Punjab State, India. It is located 25 km away from Phillaur, 5.8 km from Nurmahal, 27.7 km from district headquarter Jalandhar and 147 km from state capital Chandigarh. The village is administrated by a sarpanch who is an elected representative of the village, as per Panchayati raj (India).

== Demography ==
As of 2011, Ramgarh has a total number of 47 houses and population of 200 of which 92 are males while 108 are females according to the report published by Census India in 2011. Literacy rate of Ramgarh is 84.18%, higher than state average of 75.84%. The population of children under the age of 6 years is 23 which is 11.50% of total population of Ramgarh, and child sex ratio is approximately 769 as compared to Punjab state average of 846.

The village does not have any schedule caste and schedule tribe population so far.

45 people were engaged in work activities out of the total population of Ramgarh which includes 42 males and 3 females. According to census survey report 2011, 100% workers describe their work as main work and 0% workers are involved in marginal activity providing livelihood for less than 6 months.

== Transport ==
=== Rail ===
Nurmahal train station is the nearest train station. Phillaur Junction Railway Station is 25 km away from the village.

=== Air ===
The nearest domestic airport is located 56 km away in Ludhiana and the nearest international airport is in Chandigarh. Sri Guru Ram Das Ji International Airport is the second nearest airport which is 123 km away in Amritsar.
