= Aditya Birla Public School =

Aditya Birla Public School is the name of several private schools in India operated by the Aditya Birla Group, including:

- Aditya Birla Public School, Rayagada, Rayagada, Odisha, India
- Aditya Birla Public School, Renukoot, Renukoot, Uttar Pradesh, India
- Aditya Birla Public School, Renusagar, Renusagar, Uttar Pradesh, India
- Aditya Birla Public School, Rehla, Rehla
- Aditya Birla Public School, Veraval, Veraval, Gujarat, India
- Aditya Birla Public School, Kotputli, Kotputli, Rajasthan, India
- Aditya Birla Public School, Dalla, Dalla, Punjab, India
- Aditya Birla Public School, Rewa, Rewa, Madhya Pradesh, India
