= Sultanpur, Phillaur =

Sultanpur
- Village
- Location in Punjab, India Sultanpur (India)
- Coordinates: 31.0607186°N 75.8844245°E
- Country: India
- State: Punjab
- District: Jalandhar
- Tehsil: Phillaur

Government
  - Type: Panchayat raj
  - Body: Gram panchayat
- Elevation: 246 m (807 ft)

Population (2011)
  - Total: 761
- Sex ratio 383/378 ♂/♀

Languages
  - Official: Punjabi
- Time zone: UTC+5:30 (IST)
- PIN: 144419
- Telephone code: 01826
- ISO 3166 code: IN-PB
- Vehicle registration: PB 37
- Post office: Dayalpur
- Website: jalandhar.nic.in

Sultanpur is a medium size village in Phillaur tehsil of Jalandhar District of Punjab State, India. It is located 3 km from census town Apra, 48 km from Jalandhar through Dhuleta-Apra road and 124 km from state capital Chandigarh. Sultanpur has a postal head office in Dayalpur which is 2 km away from the village. The village is administrated by a sarpanch who is an elected representative of the village as per Panchayati raj (India).

== Caste ==
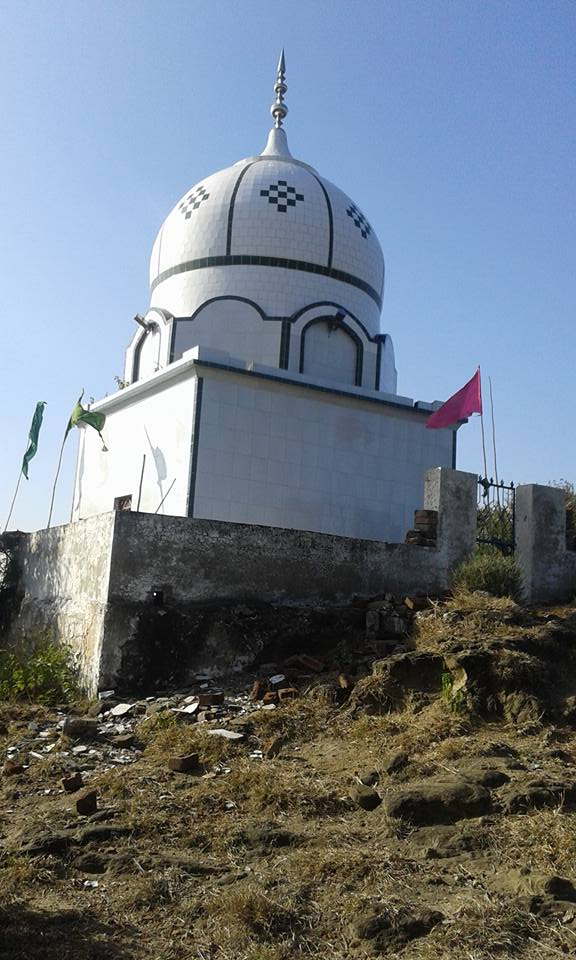
Tomb of Baba Peer Jhala

The village has a schedule caste (SC) which constitutes 38.50% of total population of the village and it doesn't have any Schedule Tribe (ST) population.

== Education ==
The village has a Punjabi Medium, Co-educational primary school (Govt. Primary School Sultanpur). The school provides mid-day meals as per the Indian Midday Meal Scheme and the meals are prepared in school premises.

== Transport ==
=== Rail ===
Phillaur Junction is the nearest train station which is situated 13 km away. However, Goraya Railway Station is 16.5 km away from the village.

=== Air ===
The nearest domestic airport is located 44 km away in Ludhiana and the nearest international airport is located in Chandigarh. Also, a second nearest international airport is 143 km away in Amritsar.
