= Sangha Khalsa =

Coordinates: 31°06′N 75°33′E

- Village
- Location in Punjab, India Sangha Khalsa (India)
- Country: India
- State: Punjab
- District: Jalandhar
- Tehsil: Phillaur

Government
  - Type: Panchayat raj
  - Body: Gram panchayat

Area
  - Total: 176 ha (430 acres)

Population (2011)
  - Total: 674; 336/338 ♂/♀
  - Scheduled Castes: 203; 112/91 ♂/♀
  - Total Households: 138

Languages
  - Official: Punjabi
- Time zone: UTC+5:30 (IST)
- Telephone: 01826
- ISO 3166 code: IN-PB
- Vehicle registration: PB-37
- Website: jalandhar.gov.in

Sangha Khalsa is a village in Phillaur in Jalandhar district of Punjab State, India. It is located 26 kilometres (16 mi) from sub district headquarter and 33 kilometres (21 mi) from district headquarter. The village is administrated by Sarpanch an elected representative of the village.

== Demography ==
As of 2011, the village has a total number of 138 houses and a population of 674 of which 336 are males while 338 are females. According to the report published by Census India in 2011, out of the total population of the village 203 people are from Schedule Caste and the village does not have any Schedule Tribe population so far.

== See also ==
- List of villages in India
