= Samrari =

- Village
- Location in Punjab, India Samrari (India)
- Coordinates: 31.0981567°N 75.851256°E
- Country: India
- State: Punjab
- District: Jalandhar
- Tehsil: Phillaur
- Elevation: 246 m (807 ft)

Population (2011)
  - Total: 2,024
- Sex ratio 1041/983 ♂/♀

Languages
  - Official: Punjabi
  - Other spoken: Hindi
- Time zone: UTC+5:30 (IST)
- PIN: 144418
- Telephone code: 01826
- ISO 3166 code: IN-PB
- Vehicle registration: PB 37
- Post office: Bara Pind
- Website: jalandhar.nic.in

Samrari is a village in Phillaur tehsil of Jalandhar District of Punjab State, India. The village is administrated by Sarpanch who is elected representative of village. It is 2.7 km away from census town Apra and 2.3 km from Jajja Khurd. Samrari is located 4.7 km from postal head office Bara Pind, 42.3 km towards East from Jalandhar, 13.9 km from Phillaur and 121 km from Chandigarh.

== Caste ==
The village has schedule caste (SC) constitutes 43.77% of total population of the village and it doesn't have any Schedule Tribe (ST) population.

== Education ==
The village has a Punjabi Medium, Co-educational upper primary (Govt. Middle School) and a primary school (Govt. Primary School) the nearest government high school is located in Apra.

== Landmarks ==
Gurudwara Sahib Baba Banda Singh Bahadar, Gurudwara Sahib Guru Ravidas, Gurudwara Sahib Shri Dhol Baha, Sidh Baba Bhara, and Gurudwara Shaheed Singh Ji are Sikh temples. Shiv Ji Mandir, and Mata Shera Wali Mandir are Hindu temples.

=== Festival and fairs ===
People celebrate festivals and fairs annually in Samrari which have taken a semi-secular meaning and are regarded as cultural festivals by people of all religions. Samrari Shinj Mela (Traditional wrestling tournament) is one of the fair which took place at Sidh Baba Bhara Samrari annually.

== Transport ==
=== Rail ===
The nearest train station is situated 10.7 km away in Goraya and Ludhiana Jn Railway Station is 30.2 km away from the village.

=== Air ===
The nearest domestic airport is at Ludhiana which is 47.2 km away from Samrari. The nearest international airport is located in Chandigarh and a second nearest international airport is 136 km away in Amritsar.
