= Rurkee =

Indian village in Punjab

Coordinates: 31.15°N 75.71°E

Rurkee or Rurki (ਰੁੜਕੀ) is a village in Jalandhar district, Punjab. The village has two sides, Dhad Rurkee and Khaire di Patti. Villages neighbouring Rurkee include Rurka Kalan, Ghurka, Randhawa, and Pasla. Cities near Rurkee are Goraya, Phagwara, Nurmahal, and Phillaur.

== Infrastructure ==
Rurkee has a water tank that supplies water to Rurkee and a variety of other villages within the region. Rurkee also has its own bus stop. There are banks and factories in this village.

== Religion ==
The predominant religion in Rurkee is Sikhism, with a minority of Hindu residents. Despite their smaller numbers, the Hindu community organizes annual Jagarans, or Jagraatas, at the two local mandirs. Additionally, the village hosts numerous Nagar Kirtans throughout the year.

== People ==
Although there are many other surnames in the village, most of the residents are jatts of the Kooner and the Sagoo clans, and some people of the Reehal clan also live in Rurkee. Rurkee has contributed many players to the game of Kabaddi, such as, Jeeti Kooner (U.K), Sohan Kooner and Goggo Kooner. Rurkee is the home of the Shaheed Bhagat Singh Sports Club, which has held a series of large sports tournaments each year for more than a decade. Many Kharku Singh's have came from this village, such as Shaheed Bhupinder Singh Kooner allais Bhinda and Shaheed Bhai Mohinder Singh Kooner. An agriculturist, Gurdev Khush, is also from Rurkee. Rurkee is the ancestral village of Mandhir Kooner, an English international freestyle wrestler who won bronze in the 2022 Commonwealth Games.
