= Raipur Araiyan =

- Village
- Location in Punjab, India Raipur Araiyan (India)
- Coordinates: 31.0440639°N 75.887957°E
- Country: India
- State: Punjab
- District: Jalandhar
- Tehsil: Phillaur

Government
  - Type: Panchayat raj
  - Body: Gram panchayat
- Elevation: 246 m (807 ft)

Population (2011)
  - Total: 1,506
- Sex ratio 753/753 ♂/♀

Languages
  - Official: Punjabi
- Time zone: UTC+5:30 (IST)
- PIN: 144419
- Telephone code: 01826
- ISO 3166 code: IN-PB
- Vehicle registration: PB 37
- Post office: Dayalpur
- Website: jalandhar.nic.in

Raipur Araiyan or Raipur Araian is a medium size village in Phillaur tehsil of Jalandhar District of Punjab State, India. It is situated on Phillaur Nawanshahr Road and located 5.6 km from Nagar, 12.6 km from Phillaur, 55.8 km from Jalandhar and 110 km from state capital Chandigarh. Raipur Araiyan has postal head office in Dayalpur which is 2.8 km away from the village. The village is administrated by a sarpanch who is an elected representative of village as per Panchayati raj (India).

== Caste ==
The village has schedule caste (SC) constitutes 70.05% of total population of the village and it doesn't have any Schedule Tribe (ST) population.

== Education ==
The village has a Punjabi Medium, Co-educational Upper Primary school (GMS Raipur Araiyan School). The school provide mid-day meal as per Indian Midday Meal Scheme and the meal prepared in school premises. The school was founded in 1994. It also has a privet Punjabi Medium, Co-educational Primary with Upper Primary school.

== Transport ==
=== Rail ===
Phillaur Junction is the nearest train station which is situated 12 km away; however, Goraya Railway Station is 18.9 km away from the village.

=== Air ===
The nearest domestic airport is located 44 km away in Ludhiana and the nearest international airport is located in Chandigarh also a second nearest international airport is 145 km away in Amritsar.
