= Ramewal, Jalandhar =

Ramewal
- Village
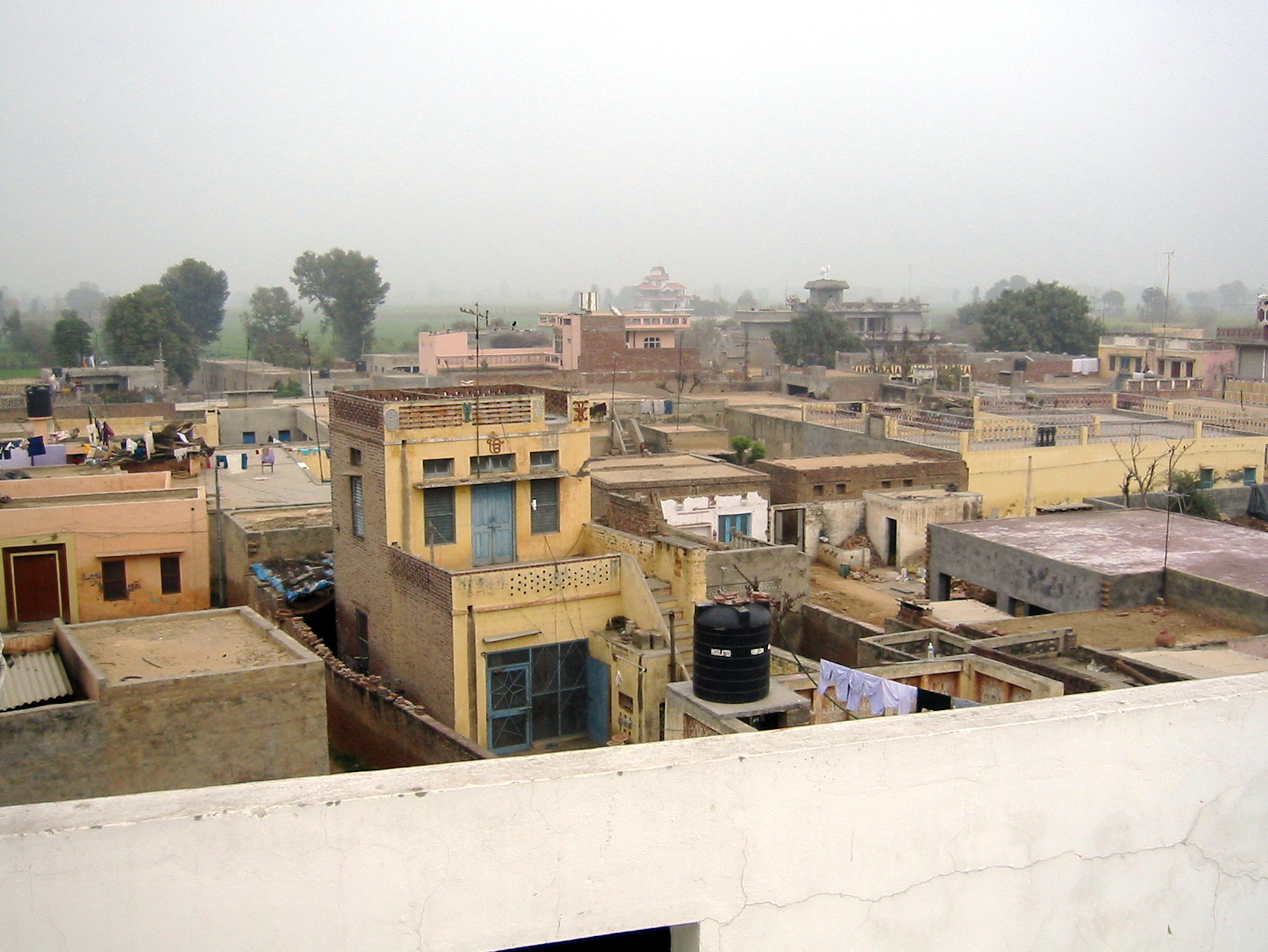

- Location in Punjab, India Ramewal (India)
- Coordinates: 31°02′55″N 75°34′49″E
- Country: India
- State: Punjab
- District: Jalandhar
- Tehsil: Phillaur

Government
  - Type: Panchayat raj
  - Body: Gram panchayat

Area
  - Total: 176 ha (430 acres)

Population (2011)
  - Total: 962; 490/472 ♂/♀
  - Scheduled Castes: 396; 201/195 ♂/♀
  - Total Households: 206

Languages
  - Official: Punjabi
- Time zone: UTC+5:30 (IST)
- Telephone: 01826
- ISO 3166 code: IN-PB
- Vehicle registration: PB-37
- Website: jalandhar.gov.in

Ramewal is a village in Phillaur in Jalandhar district of Punjab State, India. It is located 6 kilometres (3.7 mi) from sub district headquarter and 31 kilometres (19 mi) from district headquarter. The village is administrated by Sarpanch an elected representative of the village.

== Demography ==
As of 2011, the village has a total number of 206 houses and a population of 962 of which 490 are males while 472 are females. According to the report published by Census India in 2011, out of the total population of the village 396 people are from Schedule Caste and the village does not have any Schedule Tribe population so far.

== See also ==
- List of villages in India
