= Raipur Sagnewal =

- Village
- Location in Punjab, India Raipur Sagnewal (India)
- Coordinates: 31.0329231°N 75.8168002°E
- Country: India
- State: Punjab
- District: Jalandhar
- Tehsil: Phillaur

Government
  - Type: Panchayat raj
  - Body: Gram panchayat
- Elevation: 246 m (807 ft)

Population (2011)
  - Total: 260
- Sex ratio 120/140 ♂/♀

Languages
  - Official: Punjabi
- Time zone: UTC+5:30 (IST)
- PIN: 144410
- Telephone code: 01826
- ISO 3166 code: IN-PB
- Vehicle registration: PB 37
- Post office: Phillaur
- Website: jalandhar.nic.in

Raipur Sagnewal is a village in Phillaur tehsil of Jalandhar District of Punjab State, India. It is located 2 km away from Nagar, 49 km from Jalandhar and 117 km from state capital Chandigarh. Raipur Sagnewal has postal head office in Phillaur which is 5.6 km away from the village. The village is administrated by a sarpanch who is an elected representative of village as per Panchayati raj (India).

== Caste ==
The village has schedule caste (SC) constitutes 49.62% of total population of the village and it doesn't have any Schedule Tribe (ST) population.

== Education ==
The village has a Punjabi medium, Co-educational primary school (PRI Sanghewal). The school provide mid-day meal as per Indian Midday Meal Scheme and the meal prepared in school premises. The school was founded in 1961.

== Transport ==
=== Rail ===
Phillaur Junction is the nearest train station; however, Bhatian Railway Station is 11 km away from the village.

=== Air ===
The nearest domestic airport is located 37 km away in Ludhiana and the nearest international airport is located in Chandigarh also Sri Guru Ram Dass Jee International Airport is the second nearest airport which is 143 km away in Amritsar.
