= Lohgarh, Phillaur =

Lohgarh
- Village
- Location in Punjab, India Lohgarh (India)
- Coordinates: 31.1137837°N 75.8734917°E
- Country: India
- State: Punjab
- District: Jalandhar
- Tehsil: Phillaur
- Elevation: 246 m (807 ft)

Population (2011)
  - Total: 770
- Sex ratio 415/355 ♂/♀

Languages
  - Official: Punjabi
- Time zone: UTC+5:30 (IST)
- PIN: 144416
- Telephone code: 01826
- ISO 3166 code: IN-PB
- Vehicle registration: PB 37
- Post office: Apra
- Website: jalandhar.nic.in

Lohgarh is a village in the Phillaur tehsil of Jalandhar District in the state of Punjab, India. It is located 3.5 km (2.2 mi) away from postal head office Apra.

== Caste ==
As of the 2011 census, the village has population of 770. Most villagers are from schedule caste (SC) which has constitutes 51.30% of total population of the village and it does not have any Schedule Tribe (ST) population.
