= Khanpur, Phillaur =

Khanpur
- Village
- Location in Punjab, India Khanpur (India)
- Coordinates: 31.0658814°N 75.8558938°E
- Country: India
- State: Punjab
- District: Jalandhar
- Tehsil: Phillaur

Government
  - Type: Panchayat raj
  - Body: Gram panchayat
- Elevation: 246 m (807 ft)

Population (2011)
  - Total: 626
- Sex ratio 311/315 ♂/♀

Languages
  - Official: Punjabi
- Time zone: UTC+5:30 (IST)
- PIN: 144419
- Telephone code: 01826
- ISO 3166 code: IN-PB
- Vehicle registration: PB 37
- Post office: Dayalpur
- Website: jalandhar.nic.in

Khanpur is a medium size village in Phillaur tehsil of Jalandhar District of Punjab State, India. The village is administrated by Sarpanch who is elected representative of village. It is situated on Phillaur-Apra road and located 3.8 km away from Nagar, 3 km from census town Apra, 54 km from Jalandhar and 121 km from state capital Chandigarh. Khanpur has postal head office in Dayalpur which is 8 km away from the village.

== Caste ==
The village has schedule caste (SC) constitutes 78.27% of total population of the village and it doesn't have any Schedule Tribe (ST) population.

== Education ==
The village has a Punjabi Medium, Co-educational primary school (Govt. Primary School Khanpur) and other nearest government high school is located in Apra or Nagar.

== Transport ==
=== Rail ===
Phillaur Junction is the nearest train station which is situated 10.6 km away; however, Goraya Railway Station is 15 km away from the village.

=== Air ===
The nearest domestic airport is located 41 km away in Ludhiana and the nearest international airport is located in Chandigarh also a second nearest international airport is 148 km away in Amritsar.
