= Atta, Jalandhar =

Atta
- Village
- Location in Punjab, India Atta (India)
- Coordinates: 31.1094297°N 75.7769912°E
- Country: India
- State: Punjab
- District: Jalandhar
- Tehsil: Phillaur

Government
  - Body: Gram panchayat
- Elevation: 246 m (807 ft)

Population (2011)
  - Total: 3,093
- Sex ratio 1585/1508 ♂/♀

Languages
  - Official: Punjabi
  - Other spoken: Hindi
- Time zone: UTC+5:30 (IST)
- Telephone code: 01826
- ISO 3166 code: IN-PB
- Vehicle registration: PB 37
- Website: jalandhar.nic.in

Atta is a village in Phillaur tehsil of Jalandhar District of Punjab State, India. It is situated on national highway 1 and located 2.2 km away from Goraya, 18 km from Phillaur, 45.8 km from Jalandhar, and 112 km from state capital Chandigarh. The village is administrated by a Sarpanch who is an elected representative of the village.

== History ==
Atta village was founded in the year 1780 by Malhi Jatt Zamindars in the Dhak area of Doaba. It was named Atalgarh by the Malhi Jatts, later on it corrupted to its present form of Atta. Later in 1790, Sardar Sahu Singh, a Sohal Jatt, of village Athoula, was married in the family of Bara Pind Sahota Jatts. They gave him land, which extended from West of Bara Pind village up to Atalgarh (Atta) village. Sardar Sahu Singh Sohal settled in Atta village instead of his wives village.

In the early mid 1800s, Sardar Lalu Singh Malhi of Atta village, joined the Sikh Army of Maharaja Ranjit Singh at Lahore. Lalu Singh married his daughter to a high ranking Sikh Noble, Sardar Mehtab Singh Sandhu of village Mundapind, in Amritsar District of Majha Region. In 1848 During the Second Anglo Sikh wars, Mehtab Singh Sandhu was killed. His wife along with his three children moved to Atta village, where they were given land by her parents. To this day the village has four Jatt clans namely, Malhi, Sohal, Sahota and Sandhu each having their own Wards.

Other Castes living in the village are Khatris, Arora, Aad Dharmi, Ramgarhia, Brahmin, etc. Before 1947 Partition, There were Numerous Muslim families belonging to the Arain Caste (Vegetable Growers), who were forced to leave for Newly created Pakistan.

== Caste ==
The village has schedule caste (SC) constitutes 41.16% of total population of the village and it doesn't have any Schedule Tribe (ST) population.

== Education ==
The village has a Punjabi Medium, Co-educational primary school (Govt. Primary School Atta) and J.S.F.H. Khalsa Senior Sec. School is 1.5 km away from the village.

== Transport ==
=== Rail ===
The nearest train station is situated in Goraya and Ludhiana Jn Railway Station is 31 km away from the village.

=== Air ===
The nearest domestic airport is 47 km away in Ludhiana and the nearest international airport is 130 km away in Amritsar other nearest international airport is located in Chandigarh.
