= Ajtani =

- Village
- Location in Punjab, India Ajtani (India)
- Coordinates: 31°03′00.65″N 75°31′18.65″E
- Country: India
- State: Punjab
- District: Jalandhar

Languages
  - Official: Punjabi
- Time zone: UTC+5:30 (IST)
- PIN: 144039
- Telephone code: 1826
- Vehicle registration: PB- 08

Ajtani is a village in Nurmahal. Nurmahal is a sub-tehsil in the district Jalandhar of the Indian state of Punjab.

== About ==
Ajtani lies on the Nurmahal-Rajowal main road at a distance of 3 km from it. The nearest Railway station to this village is Nurmahal railway station at a distance of 8 km.

== Post code ==
Ajtani's Post office is Kot Badal Khan, postal code (PIN) 144039.
