= Akalpur =

- Village
- Location in Punjab, India Akalpur (India)
- Coordinates: 31.0287126°N 75.7647342°E
- Country: India
- State: Punjab
- District: Jalandhar
- Tehsil: Phillaur
- Elevation: 246 m (807 ft)

Population (2011)
  - Total: 1,997
- Sex ratio 1033/964 ♂/♀

Languages
  - Official: Punjabi
  - Other spoken: Hindi
- Time zone: UTC+5:30 (IST)
- PIN: 144410
- Telephone code: 01826
- ISO 3166 code: IN-PB
- Vehicle registration: PB 37
- Post office: Phillaur
- Website: jalandhar.nic.in

Akalpur is a village in Phillaur tehsil of Jalandhar District of Punjab State, India. It is 2 km from Phillaur, 45.8 km from Jalandhar, and 112 km from state capital at Chandigarh. The nearest train station is situated in Phillaur, nearest domestic airport is 33 km away in Ludhiana and the nearest international airport is 140 km away in Amritsar. The village is administered by the Sarpanch who is an elected representative of the village. It has its postal head office 2 km away in Phillaur.
