= Katana (village) =

- Village
- Location in Punjab, India Katana (India)
- Coordinates: 31.1104862°N 75.8847088°E
- Country: India
- State: Punjab
- District: Jalandhar
- Tehsil: Phillaur
- Elevation: 246 m (807 ft)

Population (2011)
  - Total: 817
- Sex ratio 411/406 ♂/♀

Languages
  - Official: Punjabi
- Time zone: UTC+5:30 (IST)
- PIN: 144416
- Telephone code: 01826
- ISO 3166 code: IN-PB
- Vehicle registration: PB 37
- Post office: Apra
- Website: jalandhar.nic.in

Katana is a medium size village in Phillaur tehsil of Jalandhar District of Punjab State, India. It is located 2 km away from Apra-Banga road and 3.3 km away from postal head office Apra. The village is 16.7 km away from Phillaur, 42.6 km from Jalandhar, and 121 km from state capital Chandigarh. The village is administrated by a sarpanch who is an elected representative of village as per Panchayati raj (India).

== Caste ==
The village has a population of 817 and in the village, most of the villagers are from scheduled caste (SC) which has constituted 33.90% of total population of the village and it doesn't have any Schedule Tribe (ST) population.

== Education ==
The village has a Punjabi Medium, Co-educational primary school (Govt. Primary School Katana). The school provides mid-day meal and it was founded in 1964. The nearest government high school is located in Apra.

== Transport ==
=== Rail ===
The nearest train station is situated 14 km away in Goraya and Ludhiana Jn Railway Station is 31.3 km away from the village.

=== Air ===
The nearest domestic airport is 48 km away in Ludhiana and the nearest international airport is 137 km away in Amritsar other nearest international airport is located in Chandigarh.
