= Bhaini =

- Village
- Location in Punjab, India Bhaini (India)
- Coordinates: 31°32′41.26″N 75°18′54.96″E
- Country: India
- State: Punjab
- District: Jalandhar
- Tehsil: Phillaur

Government
  - Type: Panchayat raj
  - Body: Gram panchayat

Area
  - Total: 167 ha (410 acres)

Population (2011)
  - Total: 782; 417/365 ♂/♀
  - Scheduled Castes: 509; 275/234 ♂/♀
  - Total Households: 166

Languages
  - Official: Punjabi
- Time zone: UTC+5:30 (IST)
- Telephone: 01826
- ISO 3166 code: IN-PB
- Vehicle registration: PB-37
- Website: jalandhar.gov.in

Bhaini is a village in Phillaur in Jalandhar district of Punjab State, India. It is located 6 kilometres (3.7 mi) from sub district headquarters and 50 kilometres (31 mi) from district headquarters. The village is administered by a Sarpanch who is an elected representative of the village.

== Demography ==
As of 2011, the village has a total number of 166 houses and a population of 782 of which 417 are males while 365 are females. According to the report published by Census India in 2011, out of the total population of the village 509 people are from Schedule Caste and the village does not have any Schedule Tribe population so far.

== See also ==
- List of villages in India
