= Burj Pukhta =

- Village
- Location in Punjab, India Burj Pukhta (India)
- Coordinates: 31.0341593°N 75.8010314°E
- Country: India
- State: Punjab
- District: Jalandhar
- Tehsil: Phillaur

Government
  - Type: Panchayat raj
  - Body: Gram panchayat
- Elevation: 246 m (807 ft)

Population (2011)
  - Total: 510
- Sex ratio 245/265 ♂/♀

Languages
  - Official: Punjabi
- Time zone: UTC+5:30 (IST)
- PIN: 144410
- Telephone code: 01826
- ISO 3166 code: IN-PB
- Vehicle registration: PB 37
- Post office: Phillaur
- Website: jalandhar.nic.in

Burj Pukhta or Burj Pukta, is a village in Phillaur tehsil of Jalandhar district of Punjab State, India. It is located 3.3 km away from Nagar, 47.7 km from Jalandhar and 115 km from state capital Chandigarh. Burj Pukhta has postal head office in Phillaur which is 4.5 km away from the village. The village is administrated by a sarpanch who is an elected representative of village as per Panchayati raj (India).

== Caste ==
Schedule caste (SC) constitutes 47.84% of the total population of the village, which does not have any Schedule Tribe (ST) population.

== Transport ==
=== Rail ===
Phillaur Junction is the nearest train station however, Bhatian Railway Station is 10.5 km away from the village.

=== Air ===
The nearest domestic airport is located 35 km away in Ludhiana and the nearest international airport is located in Chandigarh also Sri Guru Ram Das Ji International Airport is the second nearest airport, which is 142 km away in Amritsar.
