= Tehang =

- Village
- Location in Punjab, India Tehang (India)
- Coordinates: 31.0503833°N 75.8218002°E
- Country: India
- State: Punjab
- District: punjab
- Tehsil: Phillaur

Government
  - Type: Panchayat raj
  - Body: Gram panchayat
- Elevation: 246 m (807 ft)

Population (2011)
  - Total: 3,620
- Sex ratio 1860/1760 ♂/♀

Languages
  - Official: Punjabi
- Time zone: UTC+5:30 (IST)
- PIN: 144410
- Telephone code: 01826
- ISO 3166 code: IN-PB
- Vehicle registration: PB 37
- Post office: Phillaur
- Website: jalandhar.nic.in

Tehang is a large village in Phillaur tehsil of Jalandhar District of Punjab State, India. The village is administrated by Sarpanch who is the elected representative of village and it is located 3.2 km away from Nagar, 8.5 km from census town Apra, 43.5 km from Jalandhar and 120 km from state capital Chandigarh. Tehang has postal head office in tehang which is 7.4 km away from the village.

== Caste ==
The village has schedule caste (SC) constitutes 58.51% of total population of the village and it doesn't have any Schedule Tribe (ST) population.

== Education ==
The village has a Punjabi Medium, Co-educational Upper Primary with Secondary/Higher Secondary (GMS Tehand School). The school provide mid-day meal as per Indian Midday Meal Scheme and the meal prepared in school premises. The school was founded in 1968.

== Transport ==
=== Rail ===
Phillaur Junction is the nearest train station; however, Goraya Railway Station is 12 km away from the village.

=== Air ===
The nearest domestic airport is located 40 km away in Ludhiana and the nearest international airport is located in Chandigarh also Sri Guru Ram Dass Jee International Airport is the second nearest airport which is 138 km away in Amritsar.
