= Katpalon =

- Village
- Location in Punjab, India Katpalon (India)
- Coordinates: 31.0312446°N 75.8446365°E
- Country: India
- State: Punjab
- District: Jalandhar
- Tehsil: Phillaur

Government
  - Type: Panchayat raj
  - Body: Gram panchayat
- Elevation: 246 m (807 ft)

Population (2011)
  - Total: 1,665
- Sex ratio 843/822 ♂/♀

Languages
  - Official: Punjabi
- Time zone: UTC+5:30 (IST)
- PIN: 144410
- Telephone code: 01826
- ISO 3166 code: IN-PB
- Vehicle registration: PB 37
- Post office: Phillaur
- Website: jalandhar.nic.in

Katpalon or Kat Palon is a village in Phillaur tehsil of Jalandhar District of Punjab State, India. It is located 2 km from Nagar, 8 km from postal head office Phillaur, 51 km from Jalandhar and 118 km from state capital Chandigarh. The village is administrated by a sarpanch who is an elected representative of village as per Panchayati raj (India).

== Caste ==
The village has schedule caste (SC) constitutes 87.69% of total population of the village and it doesn't have any Schedule Tribe (ST) population.

== Education ==
The village has a Punjabi Medium, Co-educational primary school (Pri Katpalon School) founded in 1955. The schools provide mid-day meal as per Indian Midday Meal Scheme and the meal prepared in school premises.

== Transport ==
=== Rail ===
Phillaur Junction is the nearest train station; however, Bhatian Railway Station is 11 km away from the village.

=== Air ===
The nearest domestic airport is located 40 km away in Ludhiana and the nearest international airport is located in Chandigarh also a second nearest international airport is 146 km away in Amritsar.
