= Bhallowal =

Coordinates: 31°32′N 75°34′E

Bullowal
- Village
- Location in Punjab, India Bullowal (India)
- Country: India
- State: Punjab
- District: Jalandhar
- Tehsil: Bhogpur

Government
  - Type: Panchayat raj
  - Body: Gram panchayat

Area
  - Total: 166 ha (410 acres)

Population (2011)
  - Total: 479; 252/227 ♂/♀
  - Scheduled Castes: 254; 134/120 ♂/♀
  - Total Households: 97

Languages
  - Official: Punjabi
- Time zone: UTC+5:30 (IST)
- Telephone: 01826
- ISO 3166 code: IN-PB
- Vehicle registration: PB-37
- Website: jalandhar.gov.in

Bhallowal is a village in Phillaur in Jalandhar district of Punjab State, India. It is located 1 kilometre (0.62 mi) from sub district headquarter and 29 kilometres (18 mi) from district headquarter. The village is administrated by Sarpanch an elected representative of the village.

== Demography ==
As of 2011, the village has a total number of 97 houses and a population of 479 of which 252 are males while 227 are females. According to the report published by Census India in 2011, out of the total population of the village 254 people are from Schedule Caste and the village does not have any Schedule Tribe population so far.

== See also ==
- List of villages in India
