= Qadian, Jalandhar =

Qadian
- Village
- Location in Punjab, India Qadian (India)
- Coordinates: 31.0050927°N 75.6537866°E
- Country: India
- State: Punjab
- District: Jalandhar

Government
  - Type: Panchayat raj
  - Body: Gram panchayat
- Elevation: 240 m (790 ft)

Population (2011)
  - Total: 346
- Sex ratio 191/155 ♂/♀

Languages
  - Official: Punjabi
- Time zone: UTC+5:30 (IST)
- PIN: 144036
- Telephone: 01821
- ISO 3166 code: IN-PB
- Vehicle registration: PB- 08
- Post Office: Bilga
- Website: jalandhar.nic.in

Qadian is a village in Jalandhar district of Punjab State, India. It is located 7.2 km from postal head office in Bilga, 15.9 km from Phillaur, 50.3 km from district headquarter Jalandhar and 126 km from state capital Chandigarh. The village is administrated by a sarpanch who is an elected representative of village as per Panchayati raj (India).

== Demography ==
As of 2011, Qadian has a total number of 65 houses and a population of 346 of which include 195 are males while 155 are females according to the report published by Census India in 2011. The literacy rate of the village is 79.37%, higher than state average of 75.84%. The population of children under the age of 6 years is 31 which is 8.96% of total population of the village, and child sex ratio is approximately 550 lower than state average of 846.

Most of the people are from Schedule Caste which constitutes 47.40% of total population in the village. The town does not have any Schedule Tribe population so far.

As per census 2011, 117 people were engaged in work activities out of the total population of the village which includes 114 males and 3 females. According to census survey report 2011, 100% workers describe their work as main work and 0% workers are involved in marginal activity providing livelihood for less than 6 months.

== Transport ==
Partabpura railway station is the nearest train station however, Phillaur Junction train station is 15.3 km away from the village. The village is 44.2 km away from domestic airport in Ludhiana and the nearest international airport is located in Chandigarh also Sri Guru Ram Dass Jee International Airport is the second nearest airport which is 140 km away in Amritsar.
