= Bachhowal =

- Village
- Location in Punjab, India Bachhowal (India)
- Coordinates: 31.0503328°N 75.7928216°E
- Country: India
- State: Punjab
- District: Jalandhar
- Tehsil: Phillaur

Government
  - Type: Panchayat raj
  - Body: Gram panchayat
- Elevation: 246 m (807 ft)

Population (2011)
  - Total: 752
- Sex ratio 374/378 ♂/♀

Languages
  - Official: Punjabi
- Time zone: UTC+5:30 (IST)
- PIN: 144418
- Telephone code: 01826
- ISO 3166 code: IN-PB
- Vehicle registration: PB 37
- Post office: Bara Pind
- Website: jalandhar.nic.in

Bachhowal is a medium-size village in Phillaur tehsil of Jalandhar District of Punjab State, India. It is located 9.5 km away from Goraya, 43 km from Jalandhar and 117 km from state capital Chandigarh. Bachhowal has postal head office in Bara Pind which is 10 km away from the village. The village is administrated by a sarpanch who is an elected representative of village as per Panchayati raj (India).

== Caste ==
Schedule caste (SC) members constitute 53.06% of the total population of the village, and the rest 46.94% consist of Jatt farmers (GENERAL) and (OBC). The village does not have any Schedule Tribe (ST) population.

== Education ==
The village has a Punjabi Medium, Co-educational Primary school (Pri Bachhowal School). The school provide mid-day meal as per Indian Midday Meal Scheme and the meal prepared in school premises. The school was founded in 1970.

== Transport ==
=== Rail ===
Phillaur Junction is the nearest train station however, Bhatian Railway Station is 6 km away from the village.

=== Air ===
The nearest domestic airport is located 37.5 km away in Ludhiana and the nearest international airport is located in Chandigarh also Sri Guru Ram Dass Jee International Airport is the second nearest airport which is 136 km away in Amritsar.
