= Mandi, Jalandhar =

Mandi
- Village
- Location in Punjab, India Mandi (India)
- Coordinates: 31.0776302°N 75.889437°E
- Country: India
- State: Punjab
- District: Jalandhar
- Tehsil: Phillaur
- Elevation: 246 m (807 ft)

Population (2011)
  - Total: 2,121
- Sex ratio 1089/1032 ♂/♀

Languages
  - Official: Punjabi
  - Other spoken: Hindi
- Time zone: UTC+5:30 (IST)
- PIN: 144416
- Telephone code: 01826
- ISO 3166 code: IN-PB
- Vehicle registration: PB 37
- Post office: Apra
- Website: jalandhar.nic.in

Mandi is a large village in Phillaur tehsil of Jalandhar District of Punjab State, India. The village is administrated by Sarpanch Jarnail Singh Dhillon (also elected as block samiti pardhan of nearby 5 villages) who is elected representative of the village. It is 1 km away from census town and postal head office Apra. The village is 47.3 km from Jalandhar, 15 km from Phillaur and 117 km away from state capital Chandigarh.

== Caste ==
The village has schedule caste (SC) constitutes 38.00% of total population of the village followed by 35.00 % of jatt tribe most of them are Dhillon and it doesn't have any Schedule Tribe (ST) population.

== Education ==
The village has 3 Punjabi Medium, Co-educational primary schools (Govt. Primary School) The nearest high school (D.A.V Senior Secondary High School Mandi) is located 0.2 km and government high school is 1.5 km in Apra.

== Transport ==
=== Rail ===
The nearest train station is situated 15 km away in Goraya and Ludhiana Jn Railway Station is 31 km away from the village.

=== Air ===
The nearest domestic airport is at Ludhiana which is 47 km away from Mandi. The nearest international airport is located in Chandigarh and a second nearest international airport is 141 km away in Amritsar.
