= Nurewal =

- Village
- Location in Punjab, India Nurewal (India)
- Coordinates: 31.041198°N 75.8032202°E
- Country: India
- State: Punjab
- District: Jalandhar
- Tehsil: Phillaur

Government
  - Type: Panchayat raj
  - Body: Gram panchayat
- Elevation: 246 m (807 ft)

Population (2011)
  - Total: 215
- Sex ratio 110/105 ♂/♀

Languages
  - Official: Punjabi
- Time zone: UTC+5:30 (IST)
- PIN: 144410
- Telephone code: 01826
- ISO 3166 code: IN-PB
- Vehicle registration: PB 37
- Post office: Phillaur
- Website: jalandhar.nic.in

Nurewal is a village in Phillaur tehsil of Jalandhar District of Punjab State, India. It is located 2.8 km away from Nagar, 45 km from Jalandhar and 116 km from state capital Chandigarh. Nurewal has postal head office in Phillaur which is 5.3 km away from the village. The village is administrated by a sarpanch who is an elected representative of village as per Panchayati raj (India).

== Caste ==
The village has schedule caste (SC) constitutes 44.65% of total population of the village and it doesn't have any Schedule Tribe (ST) population.

== Education ==
The village has a Punjabi medium, Co-educational primary school (GPS Nurewal School). The school provide mid-day meal as per Indian Midday Meal Scheme and the meal prepared in school premises. The school was founded in 1976.

== Transport ==
=== Rail ===
Phillaur Junction is the nearest train station; however, Bhatian Railway Station is 9 km away from the village.

=== Air ===
The nearest domestic airport is located 36 km away in Ludhiana and the nearest international airport is in Chandigarh also Sri Guru Ram Dass Jee International Airport is the second nearest airport which is 140 km away in Amritsar.
