= Phalpota =

- Village
- Location in Punjab, India Phalpota (India)
- Coordinates: 31.0972395°N 75.8211565°E
- Country: India
- State: Punjab
- District: Jalandhar
- Tehsil: Phillaur
- Elevation: 246 m (807 ft)

Population (2011)
  - Total: 1,736
- Sex ratio 853/883 ♂/♀

Languages
  - Official: Punjabi
  - Other spoken: Hindi
- Time zone: UTC+5:30 (IST)
- PIN: 144418
- Telephone code: 01826
- ISO 3166 code: IN-PB
- Vehicle registration: PB 37
- Post office: Bara Pind
- Website: jalandhar.nic.in

Phalpota is a village in Phillaur tehsil of Jalandhar District of Punjab State, India. It is located 2.4 km away from postal head office Bara Pind. The village is 6.3 km away from Goraya, 12.5 km from Phillaur, 40.7 km from Jalandhar, and 123 km from state capital Chandigarh. The village is administrated by Sarpanch who is elected representative of village.

== Caste ==
The village has population of 1736 and in the village most of the villagers are from schedule caste (SC) which has constitutes 53.92% of total population of the village and it doesn't have any Schedule Tribe (ST) population.

== Education ==
Phalpota has a Punjabi medium Co-educational Upper Primary school (GMS Phalpota School) which was founded in 2001. The school also provides mid-day meals.

== Transport ==
=== Rail ===
The nearest train station is situated in Goraya and Ludhiana Jn Railway Station is 28 km away from the village.

=== Air ===
The nearest domestic airport is 44 km away in Ludhiana and the nearest international airport is 135 km away in Amritsar other nearest international airport is located in Chandigarh.
