= Turan (village) =

- Village
- Location in Punjab, India Turan (India)
- Coordinates: 31.1044004°N 75.8899122°E
- Country: India
- State: Punjab
- District: Jalandhar
- Tehsil: Phillaur
- Elevation: 246 m (807 ft)

Population (2011)
  - Total: 556
- Sex ratio 287/269 ♂/♀

Languages
  - Official: Punjabi
- Time zone: UTC+5:30 (IST)
- PIN: 144502
- Telephone code: 01826
- ISO 3166 code: IN-PB
- Vehicle registration: PB 37
- Post office: Dosanjh Kalan
- Website: jalandhar.nic.in

Turan (or Tooran) is a small village in Phillaur tehsil of Jalandhar District of Punjab State, India. It is located 1 km (0.62 mi) away from the Apra-Banga road and 11 km (6.8 mi) away from the postal head office at Dosanjh Kalan. The village is 3 km (1.9 mi) away from the census town Apra, 16 km (9.9 mi) from Phillaur, 42 km (26 mi) from Jalandhar, and 120 km (75 mi) from the state capital Chandigarh. The village is administrated by Sarpanch who is elected representative of village.

== Caste ==
The village has population of 556 and in the village most of the villagers are from schedule caste (SC) which has constitutes 34.35% of total population of the village and it doesn't have any Schedule Tribe (ST) population.

== Transport ==
=== Rail ===
The nearest train station is situated 14 km (8.7 mi) away in Goraya and Ludhiana Jn Railway Station is 30.9 km (19.2 mi) away from the village.

=== Air ===
The nearest domestic airport is 48 km (30 mi) away in Ludhiana and the nearest international airport is 137 km (85 mi) away in Amritsar. The other nearest international airport is located in Chandigarh.
