= Bhadarpur =

Coordinates: 27°48′N 77°11′E

- Village
- Location in Punjab, India Bhadarpur (India)
- Country: India
- State: Punjab
- District: Jalandhar
- Tehsil: Phillaur

Government
  - Type: Panchayat raj
  - Body: Gram panchayat

Area
  - Total: 108 ha (270 acres)

Population (2011)
  - Total: 376; 199/177 ♂/♀
  - Scheduled Castes: 299; 156/143 ♂/♀
  - Total Households: 76

Languages
  - Official: Punjabi
- Time zone: UTC+5:30 (IST)
- Telephone: 01826
- ISO 3166 code: IN-PB
- Vehicle registration: PB-37
- Website: jalandhar.gov.in

Bhadarpur is a village in Phillaur tehsil in Jalandhar district of Punjab State, India. It is located 6 kilometres (3.7 mi) from the sub district headquarters and 30 kilometres (19 mi) from the district headquarters. The village is administrated by a Sarpanch, the elected representative of the village.

== Demography ==
As of 2011, the village has a total number of 76 houses and a population of 376 of which 199 are males while 177 are females. According to the report published by Census India in 2011, out of the total population of the village 299 people are from Schedule Caste and the village does not have any Schedule Tribe population.

== See also ==
- List of villages in India
