= Khela, Punjab =

Khela
- Village
- Location in Punjab, India Khela (India)
- Coordinates: 31.0380795°N 75.6843424°E
- Country: India
- State: Punjab
- District: Jalandhar

Government
  - Type: Panchayat raj
  - Body: Gram panchayat
- Elevation: 240 m (790 ft)

Population (2011)
  - Total: 639
- Sex ratio 323/316 ♂/♀

Languages
  - Official: Punjabi
- Time zone: UTC+5:30 (IST)
- PIN: 144036
- Telephone: 01821
- ISO 3166 code: IN-PB
- Vehicle registration: PB- 08
- Post office: Bilga
- Website: jalandhar.nic.in

Khela is a village in Jalandhar district of Punjab State, India. It is located 4.7 km away from postal head office in Bilga, 12.7 km from Nurmahal, 45 km from district headquarter Jalandhar and 122 km from state capital Chandigarh. The village is administrated by a sarpanch, who is an elected representative.

== Education ==
The village has a Punjabi medium, co-ed upper primary school (GMS Khela). The school provide mid-day meal as per Indian Midday Meal Scheme and the meal prepared in school premises and it was found in 1994.

== Demography ==
According to the report published by Census India in 2011, Khela has a total number of 124 houses and population of 639 of which include 323 males and 316 females. Literacy rate of Khela is 79.44%, higher than state average of 75.84%. The population of children under the age of 6 years is 70 which is 10.95% of total population of Khela, and child sex ratio is approximately 795 higher than state average of 846.

Most of the people are from Jat Caste which constitutes 47.73% of total population in Khela. The town does not have any Schedule Tribe population so far.

As per census 2011, 200 people were engaged in work activities out of the total population of Khela which includes 188 males and 12 females. According to census survey report 2011, 70% workers describe their work as main work and 30% workers are involved in marginal activity providing livelihood for less than 6 months.

== Transport ==
Partabpura railway station is the nearest train station; however, Phillaur Junction train station is 12.4 km away from the village. The village is 43.3 km away from domestic airport in Ludhiana and the nearest international airport is located in Chandigarh also Sri Guru Ram Dass Jee International Airport is the second nearest airport which is 140 km away in Amritsar.

== Notable Persons ==
Subadar Suhel Singh, I.O.M. (Shaheed) Subadar Suhel Singh is one of the most distinguished historical figures of Khela village. He served in the British Indian Army with the 58th Vaughan's Rifles (Frontier Force) during World War I and was a highly decorated officer. Subadar Singh was awarded the Indian Order of Merit (I.O.M.), the highest gallantry award available to Indian soldiers at the time, recognizing his exceptional bravery in action. He was killed on the Western Front on September 25, 1915. As he has no known grave, Subadar Suhel Singh is officially commemorated overseas on the walls of the Neuve-Chapelle Memorial in France, maintained by the Commonwealth War Graves Commission, where he is listed as the son of Diwan Singh, of Khele, Phillaur, Jullundur (Jalandhar). Locally, the people of Khela honor him as a Shaheed (Martyr). A shrine (Samadhi) has been constructed in Khela village in his memory, serving as a permanent, sacred testament to his sacrifice and the enduring respect he holds within his community. His dual commemoration—on a major war memorial in France and a personal shrine in his home village—pays homage to a true son of Khela.
