= Pal Qadiam =

- Village
- Location in Punjab, India Pal Qadiam (India)
- Coordinates: 31.0669588°N 75.8361232°E
- Country: India
- State: Punjab
- District: Jalandhar
- Tehsil: Phillaur

Government
  - Type: Panchayat raj
  - Body: Gram panchayat
- Elevation: 246 m (807 ft)

Population (2011)
  - Total: 1,063
- Sex ratio 546/517 ♂/♀

Languages
  - Official: Punjabi
- Time zone: UTC+5:30 (IST)
- PIN: 144410
- Telephone code: 01826
- ISO 3166 code: IN-PB
- Vehicle registration: PB 37
- Post office: Phillaur
- Website: jalandhar.nic.in

Pal Qadiam is a medium size village in Phillaur tehsil of Jalandhar District of Punjab State, India. It is located 3.8 km away from Nagar, 4 km from census town Apra, 45 km from Jalandhar and 121 km from state capital Chandigarh. Pal Qadiam has postal head office in Phillaur which is 10 km away from the village. The village is administrated by a sarpanch who is an elected representative of village as per Panchayati raj (India).

== Caste ==
The village has schedule caste (SC) constitutes 47.04% of total population of the village and it doesn't have any Schedule Tribe (ST) population.

== Transport ==
=== Rail ===
Phillaur Junction is the nearest train station which is situated 10 km away; however, Goraya Railway Station is 13 km away from the village.

=== Air ===
The nearest domestic airport is located 40 km away in Ludhiana and the nearest international airport is located in Chandigarh also a second nearest international airport is 140 km away in Amritsar.
