= Achan Chak =

- Village
- Location in Punjab, India Achan Chak (India)
- Coordinates: 31.0124605°N 75.8032904°E
- Country: India
- State: Punjab
- District: Jalandhar
- Tehsil: Phillaur

Government
  - Type: Panchayat raj
  - Body: Gram panchayat
- Elevation: 246 m (807 ft)

Population (2011)
  - Total: 138
- Sex ratio 69/69 ♂/♀

Languages
  - Official: Punjabi
- Time zone: UTC+5:30 (IST)
- PIN: 144410
- Telephone code: 01826
- ISO 3166 code: IN-PB
- Vehicle registration: PB 37
- Post office: Phillaur
- Website: jalandhar.nic.in

Achan Chak is a small size village in Phillaur tehsil of Jalandhar District of Punjab State, India. It is located 8 km from Nagar, 3 km from Phillaur, 48 km from Jalandhar and 116 km from state capital Chandigarh. Achan Chak has postal head office in Phillaur. The village is administrated by a sarpanch who is an elected representative of village as per Panchayati raj (India).

== Demography ==
According to the report published by 2011 census of India, Achan Chak has a total number of 26 houses and population of 138 of which include 69 males and 69 females. Literacy rate of Achan Chak is 78.07%, higher than state average of 75.84%. The population of children under the age of 6 years is 24 which is 17.39% of total population of Achan Chak, and child sex ratio is approximately 714 lower than state average of 846.

Most of the people are from Schedule Caste which constitutes 81.88% of total population in Achan Chak. The town does not have any Schedule Tribe population so far.

As per census 2011, 87 people were engaged in work activities out of the total population of Achan Chak which includes 42 males and 45 females. According to census survey report 2011, 82.76% workers describe their work as main work and 17.24% workers are involved in marginal activity providing livelihood for less than 6 months.

== Transport ==
=== Rail ===
Phillaur Junction is the nearest train station however, Bhatian Railway Station is 11 km away from the village.

=== Air ===
The nearest domestic airport is located 35 km away in Ludhiana and the nearest international airport is located in Chandigarh also a second nearest international airport is 143 km away in Amritsar.
