= Rasulpur, Phillaur =

Rasulpur
- Village
- Location in Punjab, India Rasulpur (India)
- Coordinates: 31.0503833°N 75.8218002°E
- Country: India
- State: Punjab
- District: Jalandhar
- Tehsil: Phillaur

Government
  - Type: Panchayat raj
  - Body: Gram panchayat
- Elevation: 246 m (807 ft)

Population (2011)
  - Total: 1,556
- Sex ratio 788/768 ♂/♀

Languages
  - Official: Punjabi
- Time zone: UTC+5:30 (IST)
- PIN: 144410
- Telephone code: 01826
- ISO 3166 code: IN-PB
- Vehicle registration: PB 37
- Post office: Phillaur
- Website: jalandhar.nic.in

Rasulpur is a village in Phillaur tehsil of Jalandhar District of Punjab State, India. The village is administrated by Sarpanch who is the elected representative of village and it is located 1.5 km away from Nagar, 8.6 km from census town Apra, 50 km from Jalandhar and 117 km from state capital Chandigarh. Rasulpur has postal head office in Phillaur which is 6.6 km away from the village.

== Caste ==
The village has schedule caste (SC) constitutes 68.38% of total population of the village and it doesn't have any Schedule Tribe (ST) population.

== Transport ==
=== Rail ===
Phillaur Junction is the nearest train station however, Goraya Railway Station is 14 km away from the village.

=== Air ===
The nearest domestic airport is located 37 km away in Ludhiana and the nearest international airport is located in Chandigarh also Sri Guru Ram Dass Jee International Airport is the second nearest airport which is 144 km away in Amritsar.
