= Shahpur, Phillaur =

Shahpur
- Village
- Location in Punjab, India Shahpur (India)
- Coordinates: 31.0711264°N 75.7948172°E
- Country: India
- State: Punjab
- District: Jalandhar
- Tehsil: Phillaur

Government
  - Type: Panchayat raj
  - Body: Gram panchayat
- Elevation: 246 m (807 ft)

Population (2011)
  - Total: 1,722
- Sex ratio 890/832 ♂/♀

Languages
  - Official: Punjabi
- Time zone: UTC+5:30 (IST)
- PIN: 144410
- Telephone code: 01826
- ISO 3166 code: IN-PB
- Vehicle registration: PB 37
- Post office: Phillaur
- Website: jalandhar.nic.in

Shahpur is a medium size village in Phillaur tehsil of Jalandhar District of Punjab State, India. It is located 7.7 km away from Goraya, 41 km from Jalandhar and 122 km from state capital Chandigarh. Shahpur has postal head office in Phillaur which is 11 km away from the village. The village is administrated by Sarpanch who is the elected representative of village.

== Caste ==
The village has schedule caste (SC) constitutes 54.01% of total population of the village and it doesn't have any Schedule Tribe (ST) population.

== Education ==
The village has a Punjabi Medium, Co-educational Upper Primary school (GMS Shahpur School). The school provide mid-day meal as per Indian Midday Meal Scheme and the meal prepared in school premises. The school was founded in 1954.

=== Colleges ===
Below is the list of college/institutes in Shahpur:

- Ct Institute Of Pharmaceutical Sciences
- M.k. College Of Education

== Transport ==
=== Rail ===
Phillaur Junction is the nearest train station however, Bhatian Railway Station is 4 km away from the village.

=== Air ===
The nearest domestic airport is located 38 km away in Ludhiana and the nearest international airport is located in Chandigarh also Sri Guru Ram Dass Jee International Airport is the second nearest airport which is 136 km away in Amritsar.
