= Hardo Sangha =

- Village
- Location in Punjab, India Hardo Sangha (India)
- Coordinates: 31.0032494°N 75.5435894°E
- Country: India
- State: Punjab
- District: Jalandhar

Government
  - Type: Panchayat raj
  - Body: Gram panchayat
- Elevation: 240 m (790 ft)

Population (2011)
  - Total: 1,000
- Sex ratio 545/455 ♂/♀

Languages
  - Official: Punjabi
- Time zone: UTC+5:30 (IST)
- PIN: 144039
- Telephone: 01821
- ISO 3166 code: IN-PB
- Vehicle registration: PB- 08
- Post Office: Nurmahal
- Website: jalandhar.nic.in

Hardo Sangha is a village in Jalandhar district of Punjab State, India. It is located 15 km away from postal head office Nurmahal, 24.6 km from Phillaur, 43.5 km from district headquarter Jalandhar and 134 km from state capital Chandigarh. The village is administrated by a sarpanch who is an elected representative of village as per Panchayati raj (India).

== Education ==
The village has a Punjabi medium, co-ed primary school (GPS Gadra). The school provide mid-day meal as per Indian Midday Meal Scheme and the meal prepared in school premises and it was found in 1976.

== Demography ==
According to the report published by Census India in 2011, Hardo Sangha has a total number of 86 houses and population of 468 of which include 257 males and 211 females. Literacy rate of Hardo Sangha is 68.10%, lower than state average of 75.84%. The population of children under the age of 6 years is 48 which is 10.26% of total population of Hardo Sangha, and child sex ratio is approximately 1000 higher than state average of 846.

Most of the people are from Schedule Caste which constitutes 29.91% of total population in Hardo Sangha. The town does not have any Schedule Tribe population so far.

As per census 2011, 171 people were engaged in work activities out of the total population of Hardo Sangha which includes 145 males and 26 females. According to census survey report 2011, 57.31% workers describe their work as main work and 42.69% workers are involved in marginal activity providing livelihood for less than 6 months.

== Transport ==
Nurmahal railway station is the nearest train station; however, Nakodar train station is 19.7 km away from the village. The village is 54.8 km away from domestic airport in Ludhiana and the nearest international airport is located in Chandigarh also Sri Guru Ram Dass Jee International Airport is the second nearest airport which is 136 km away in Amritsar.
