= Palnau =

- Village
- Location in Punjab, India Palnau (India)
- Coordinates: 31.070598°N 75.8386553°E
- Country: India
- State: Punjab
- District: Jalandhar
- Tehsil: Phillaur
- Elevation: 246 m (807 ft)

Population (2011)
  - Total: 751
- Sex ratio 375/376 ♂/♀

Languages
  - Official: Punjabi
- Time zone: UTC+5:30 (IST)
- PIN: 144410
- Telephone code: 01826
- ISO 3166 code: IN-PB
- Vehicle registration: PB 37
- Post office: Phillaur
- Website: jalandhar.nic.in

Palnau is a village in Phillaur tehsil of Jalandhar District of Punjab State, India. The village is administrated by Sarpanch who is elected representative of village and it is located 3.4 kilometres (2 mi) away from Nagar, 4 kilometres (2 mi) from census town Apra, and 121 kilometres (75 mi) from state capital Chandigarh. Palnau has postal head office in Phillaur which is 9.8 km (6 mi) away from the village.

== Caste ==
The village has schedule caste (SC) constitutes 35.42% of total population of the village and it doesn't have any Schedule Tribe (ST) population.

== Transport ==
=== Rail ===
Phillaur Junction is the nearest train station which is situated 9 km (5.6 mi) away; however, Goraya Railway Station is 14 km (8.7 mi) away from the village.

=== Air ===
The nearest domestic airport is located 40 km (25 mi) away in Ludhiana and the nearest international airport is located in Chandigarh also a second nearest international airport is 140 km (87 mi) away in Amritsar.
