= Khojpur, Punjab =

Khojpur
- Village
- Location in Punjab, India Khojpur (India)
- Coordinates: 31.0998449°N 75.6932892°E
- Country: India
- State: Punjab
- District: Jalandhar

Government
  - Type: Panchayat raj
  - Body: Gram panchayat
- Elevation: 240 m (790 ft)

Population (2011)
  - Total: 145
- Sex ratio 80/65 ♂/♀

Languages
  - Official: Punjabi
- Time zone: UTC+5:30 (IST)
- PIN: 144037
- Telephone: 01824
- ISO 3166 code: IN-PB
- Vehicle registration: PB- 08
- Website: jalandhar.nic.in

Khojpur is a village in Jalandhar district of Punjab State, India. It is located 1.5 km away from Pasla, 16 km from Phillaur, 33 km from the district headquarter Jalandhar and 126 km from the state capital Chandigarh. The village is administrated by a sarpanch who is an elected representative of the village as per Panchayati raj (India).

== Demography ==
According to the report published by Census India in 2011, Khojpur has a total number of 31 houses and population of 145 of which include 80 males and 65 females. Literacy rate of Khojpur is 81.88%, higher than state average of 75.84%. The population of children under the age of 6 years is 7 which is 4.83% of total population of Khojpur, and child sex ratio is approximately 400 lower than state average of 846.

The village does not have any Schedule Caste or Schedule Tribe population.

As per census 2011, 55 people were engaged in work activities out of the total population of Khojpur which includes 51 males and 4 females. According to census survey report 2011, 100% workers describe their work as main work and 0% workers are involved in marginal activity providing livelihood for less than 6 months.

== Transport ==
Partabpura railway station is the nearest train station; however, Phillaur Junction train station is 15 km away from the village. The village is 46.6 km away from domestic airport in Ludhiana and the nearest international airport is located in Chandigarh also Sri Guru Ram Dass Jee International Airport is the second nearest airport which is 136 km away in Amritsar.
