= Garhi Mahan Singh =

- Village
- Location in Punjab, India Garhi Mahan Singh (India)
- Coordinates: 31.1137837°N 75.8734917°E
- Country: India
- State: Punjab
- District: Jalandhar
- Tehsil: Phillaur
- Elevation: 246 m (807 ft)

Population (2011)
  - Total: 1,231
- Sex ratio 569/635 ♂/♀

Languages
  - Official: Punjabi
- Time zone: UTC+5:30 (IST)
- PIN: 144416
- Telephone code: 01826
- ISO 3166 code: IN-PB
- Vehicle registration: PB 37
- Post office: Apra
- Website: jalandhar.nic.in

Garhi Mahan Singh (also spelled Garhi Maha Singh or Garhi Mahan Singh) is a medium size village in Phillaur tehsil of Jalandhar District of Punjab State, India. It is located 3.1 km away from postal head office Apra. The village is 16.4 km away from Phillaur, 43.5 km from Jalandhar, and 119 km from state capital Chandigarh. The village is administrated by a sarpanch who is an elected representative of village as per Panchayati raj (India).

== Caste ==
The village has population of 1231 and in the village most of the villagers are from schedule caste (SC) which has constitutes 44.03% of total population of the village and it doesn't have any Schedule Tribe (ST) population.

== Transport ==
=== Rail ===
The nearest train station is situated 12.7 km away in Goraya and Ludhiana Jn Railway Station is 30.9 km away from the village.

=== Air ===
The nearest domestic airport is 48 km away in Ludhiana and the nearest international airport is 138 km away in Amritsar other nearest international airport is located in Chandigarh.
