= Danduwal =

- Village
- Location in Punjab, India Danduwal (India)
- Coordinates: 31.1364786°N 75.6830443°E
- Country: India
- State: Punjab
- District: Jalandhar
- Tehsil: Rurka Kalan

Government
  - Type: Panchayat raj
  - Body: Gram panchayat
- Elevation: 246 m (807 ft)

Population (2011)
  - Total: 1,287
- Sex ratio 663/624 ♂/♀

Languages
  - Official: Punjabi
- Time zone: UTC+5:30 (IST)
- PIN: 144037
- Telephone: 01824
- ISO 3166 code: IN-PB
- Vehicle registration: PB- 08
- Post Office: Pasla
- Website: jalandhar.nic.in

Danduwal is a village in Rurka Kalan tehsil in Jalandhar district of Punjab State, India. It is located 2.4 km away from Rurka Kalan, 19.6 km from Phillaur, 29 km from district headquarter Jalandhar and 132 km from state capital Chandigarh. The village is administrated by a sarpanch who is an elected representative of village as per Panchayati raj (India).

== Education ==
The village has a Punjabi medium, co-ed primary school (PRI Danduwal). The school provide mid-day meal as per Indian Midday Meal Scheme and the meal prepared in school premises and it was found in 1972.

== Demography ==
According to the report published by Census India in 2011, Danduwal has a total number of 270 houses and population of 1287 of which 663 males and 624 females. Literacy rate of Danduwal is 81.63%, higher than state average of 75.84%. The population of children under the age of 6 years is 106 which is 8.24% of total population of Danduwal, and child sex ratio is approximately 738 lower than state average of 846.

Most of the people are from Schedule Caste which constitutes 51.90% of total population in Danduwal. The town does not have any Schedule Tribe population so far.

As per census 2011, 549 people were engaged in work activities out of the total population of Danduwal which includes 398 males and 151 females. According to census survey report 2011, 81.60% workers describe their work as main work and 18.40% workers are involved in marginal activity providing livelihood for less than 6 months.

== Transport ==
Nurmahal railway station is the nearest train station; however, Phagwara Junction train station is 16.4 km away from the village. The village is 53.2 km away from domestic airport in Ludhiana and the nearest international airport is located in Chandigarh also Sri Guru Ram Dass Jee International Airport is the second nearest airport which is 132 km away in Amritsar.
