= Gag Alias Dhagara =

- Village
- Location in Punjab, India Gag Alias Dhagara (India)
- Coordinates: 30.9844238°N 75.5770204°E
- Country: India
- State: Punjab
- District: Jalandhar

Government
  - Type: Panchayat raj
  - Body: Gram panchayat
- Elevation: 237 m (778 ft)

Population (2011)
  - Total: 497
- Sex ratio 255/242 ♂/♀

Languages
  - Official: Punjabi
- Time zone: UTC+5:30 (IST)
- PIN: 144039
- ISO 3166 code: IN-PB
- Vehicle registration: PB- 08
- Website: jalandhar.nic.in

Gag Alias Dhagara is a village in Jalandhar district of Punjab State, India. It is located 13.9 km away from Nurmahal, 22 km from Phillaur, 41.9 km from district headquarter Jalandhar and 143 km from state capital Chandigarh. The village is administrated by a sarpanch who is an elected representative of village as per Panchayati raj (India).

== Demography ==
According to the report published by Census India in 2011, Gag Alias Dhagara has a total number of 99 houses and population of 497 of which include 255 males and 242 females. Literacy rate of Gag Alias Dhagara is 72.73%, lower than state average of 75.84%. The population of children under the age of 6 years is 68 which is 13.68% of total population of Gag Alias Dhagara, and child sex ratio is approximately 1000 higher than state average of 846.

Most of the people are from Schedule Caste which constitutes 56.54% of total population in Gag Alias Dhagara. The town does not have any Schedule Tribe population so far.

As per census 2011, 300 people were engaged in work activities out of the total population of Gag Alias Dhagara which includes 160 males and 140 females. According to census survey report 2011, 54% workers describe their work as main work and 46% workers are involved in marginal activity providing livelihood for less than 6 months.

== Transport ==
Nurmahal railway station is the nearest train station; however, Phillaur Junction train station is 21.6 km away from the village. The village is 52.4 km away from domestic airport in Ludhiana and the nearest international airport is located in Chandigarh also Sri Guru Ram Dass Jee International Airport is the second nearest airport which is 138 km away in Amritsar.
