= Chak Sahbu =

Chak Sabhu
- Village
- Location in Punjab, India Chak Sabhu (India)
- Coordinates: 31.079715°N 75.877359°E
- Country: India
- State: Punjab
- District: Jalandhar
- Tehsil: Phillaur
- Elevation: 246 m (807 ft)

Population (2011)
  - Total: 1,830

Languages
  - Official: Punjabi
- Time zone: UTC+5:30 (IST)
- PIN: 144416
- Telephone code: 01826
- ISO 3166 code: IN-PB
- Vehicle registration: PB 37
- Post office: Apra
- Website: jalandhar.nic.in

Chak Sahbu (or Chak Saboo) is a small village in Jalandhar District of Punjab State, India. The village is administrated by Sarpanch who is elected representative of village. It is located 49 km towards East from Jalandhar, 14 km from Phillaur and 119 km from Chandigarh. The nearest census town and marketplace is located 1 km in Apra, Punjab. The nearest train station is situated 13.9 km away in Phillaur, nearest domestic airport is at Ludhiana and the nearest international airport is 143 km away in Amritsar.

== Festival and fairs ==
Gurudwara Singh Sabha Sahib and Shahi Darbar Baba Gugga jahar Peer Shakandi are religious sites. People celebrate festivals and fairs annually in Chak Sahbu which have taken a semi-secular meaning and are regarded as cultural festivals by people of all religions.

- Shakandi Peer Shinj Mela (Traditional Wrestling Tournament)
- Kabaddi tournament
- Gurmat Samagam

== Demography ==
According to the 2011 Census, Chak Sahbu had a population of 1,830: 888 males and 942 females in 381 families. The village had lower literacy rate as compared to Punjab. The population of children under the age of 6 years is 191 which makes up 10.44% of total population of the village, and male literacy stood at 74.00% while the female literacy rate was 70.42%. Average Sex Ratio of the village is 1061 which is higher than Punjab state average of 895. Child Sex Ratio for the village as per census is 1274, higher than Punjab average of 846. The village has schedule caste (SC) constitutes 46.61% of total population of the village and it doesn't have any Schedule Tribe (ST) population.
