= Kot Badal Khan =

- Village
- Location in Punjab, India Kot Badal Khan (India)
- Country: India
- State: Punjab
- District: Jalandhar
- Tehsil: Phillaur

Government
  - Type: Panchayat raj
  - Body: Gram panchayat

Area
  - Total: 337 ha (830 acres)

Population (2011)
  - Total: 2,600; 1,341/1,259 ♂/♀
  - Scheduled Castes: 1,026; 549/477 ♂/♀
  - Total Households: 509

Languages
  - Official: Punjabi
- Time zone: UTC+5:30 (IST)
- PIN: 144039
- Telephone: 01826
- ISO 3166 code: IN-PB
- Vehicle registration: PB-37
- Website: jalandhar.gov.in

Kot Badal Khan is a village in Phillaur in Jalandhar district of Punjab State, India. It is located 22 kilometres (14 mi) from sub district headquarter and 44 kilometres (27 mi) from district headquarter. The village is administrated by Sarpanch an elected representative of the village.

== Demography ==
As of 2011, the village has a total number of 509 houses and a population of 2600 of which 1341 are males while 1259 are females. According to the report published by Census India in 2011, out of the total population of the village 1026 people are from Schedule Caste and the village does not have any Schedule Tribe population so far.

== See also ==
- List of villages in India
