= Nahal, Jalandhar =

Nahal
- village
- Location in Punjab, India Nahal (India)
- Coordinates: 31.4523253°N 75.7082516°E
- Country: India
- State: Punjab

Government
  - Type: Panchayati raj (India)
  - Body: Gram panchayat
- Elevation: 95.7072 m (314.000 ft)

Population (2011)
  - Total: 1,714

Languages
  - Official: Punjabi
- Time zone: UTC+5:30 (IST)
- PIN: 144002
- Telephone code: +91-181-274 XXXX
- Vehicle registration: PB 08
- Nearest city: Adampur Doaba, Bhogpur Sirwal

Nahal is a relatively small village located in Jalandhar district in the state of Punjab in north India.

== Location ==
The village is located off the West of Jalandhar, near basti Danishmandan and is about 10-12 kilometres away from the Jalandhar city centre.

== Census 2011 ==
Nahal is a medium size village located in Jalandhar - II of Jalandhar district, Punjab with total 349 families residing. The Nahal village has population of 1714 of which 884 are males while 830 are females as per Population Census 2011.

In Nahal village population of children with age 0-6 is 159 which makes up 9.28% of total population of village. Average Sex Ratio of Nahal village is 939 which is higher than Punjab state average of 895. Child Sex Ratio for the Nahal as per census is 963, higher than Punjab average of 846.

Nahal village has higher literacy rate compared to Punjab. In 2011, literacy rate of Nahal village was 78.71% compared to 75.84% of Punjab. In Nahal Male literacy stands at 83.56% while female literacy rate was 73.54%.

== Administration ==
As per the constitution of India and the Panchyati Raaj Act, Nahal village is administrated by Sarpanch (Head of Village) who is elected representative of village.

Much of the development of the village was carried out under the leadership of Shmt Gagandeep Kaur, who was elected Sarpanch

The current sarpanch is Yashpal as of 22 June 2024 who has much further developed the streets from traditional bricked streets to modern interlock concrete brick streets and also developed the sewage system to an underground one from the open roadside canal one.

== Area information ==
Nahal has various shops and service providers. There are two Gurdwara in this village. There is one government School up to 5th class/grade in the village. nearest railway station is at Adampur Doaba. Some streets are fairly narrow and suitable for single-lane driving, and mostly, they are wide enough. The land around the village is flat and fertile.
