= Thalla =

- village
- Location in Punjab, India Thalla (India)
- Coordinates: 31.0515691°N 75.8613146°E
- Country: India
- State: Punjab
- District: Jalandhar

Population (2011)
  - Total: 2,251

Languages
  - Official: Punjabi
- Time zone: UTC+5:30 (IST)
- Vehicle registration: PB 37
- Coastline: 0 kilometres (0 mi)
- Nearest city: Phillaur

Thalla is a village near Nagar, Tehsil Phillaur, Jalandhar district, in Punjab, India.

== Demographics ==
According to 2011 Census, Thalla has a population of 2,251 people. The village has 352 acres (1.42 km^{2}). Neighbouring villages include Bansia Dhak, Bhar Singh Pur, Khanpur, Pall Kadim, Rasulpur, Nagar, Katpalon, Ashahoor and Kadiana.

== History ==
It is said that the village is named after Maha Singh of Thal desert who lived during Maharaja Ranjit Singh's rule, thus making the village at least 200 years old. Maha Singh's descendants live in the village and are known as Jagirdars. The village is famous for the Shaheed Mohinder Singh Tiger BSF Annual Memorial Tournament which takes place in December.

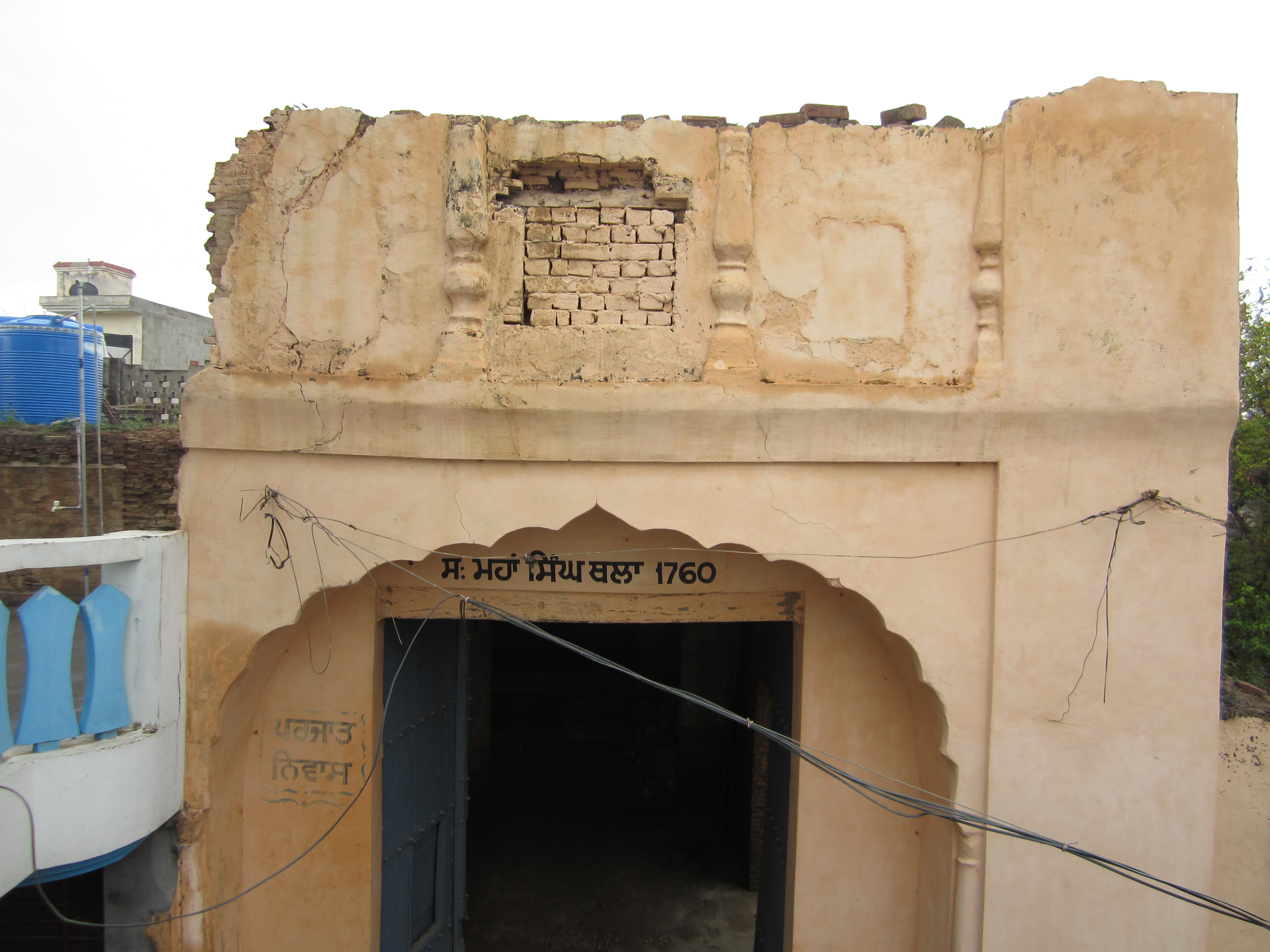
Gate of Maha Singh Lidhar Fort

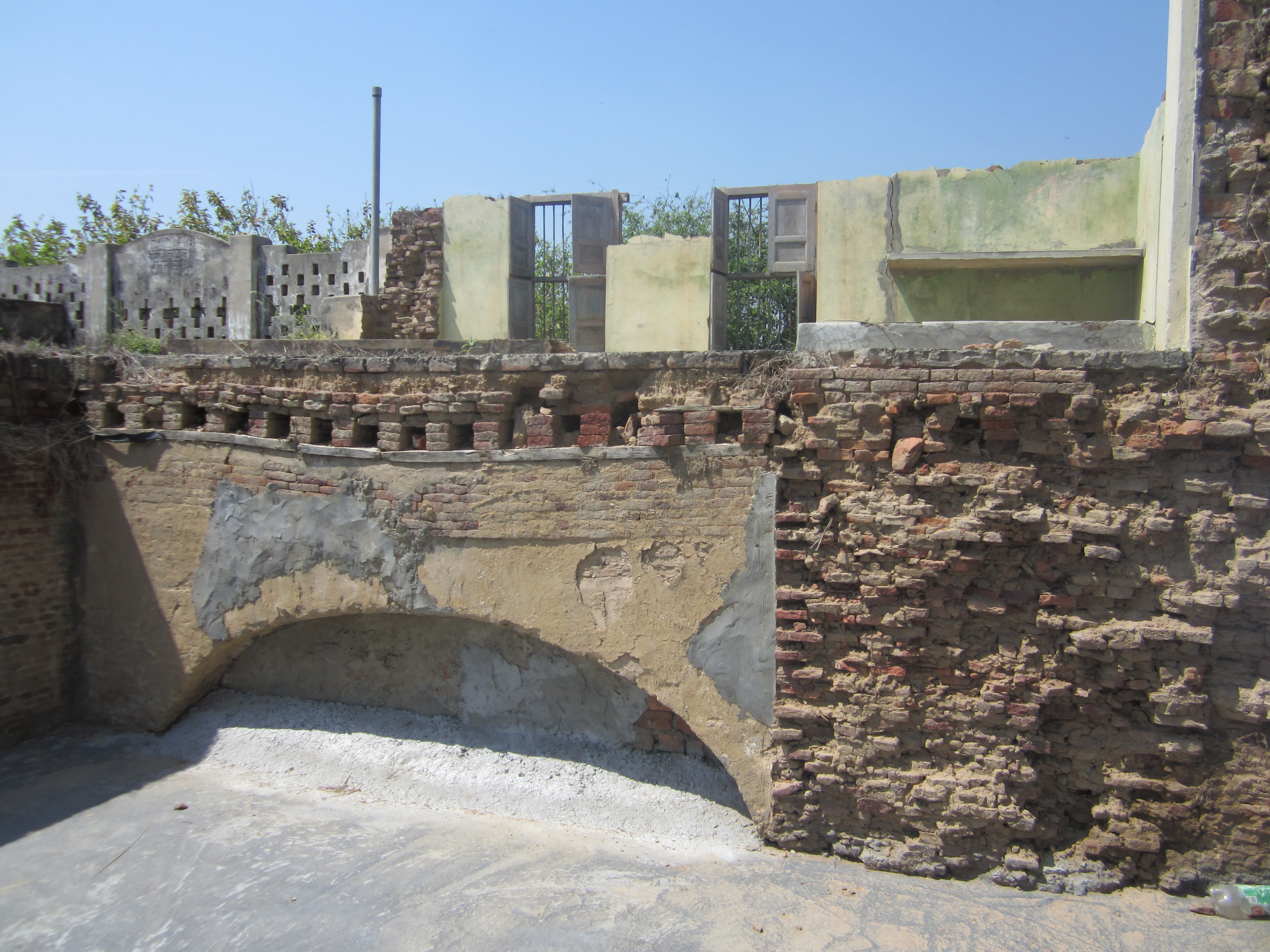
Fort of Maha Singh Lidhar

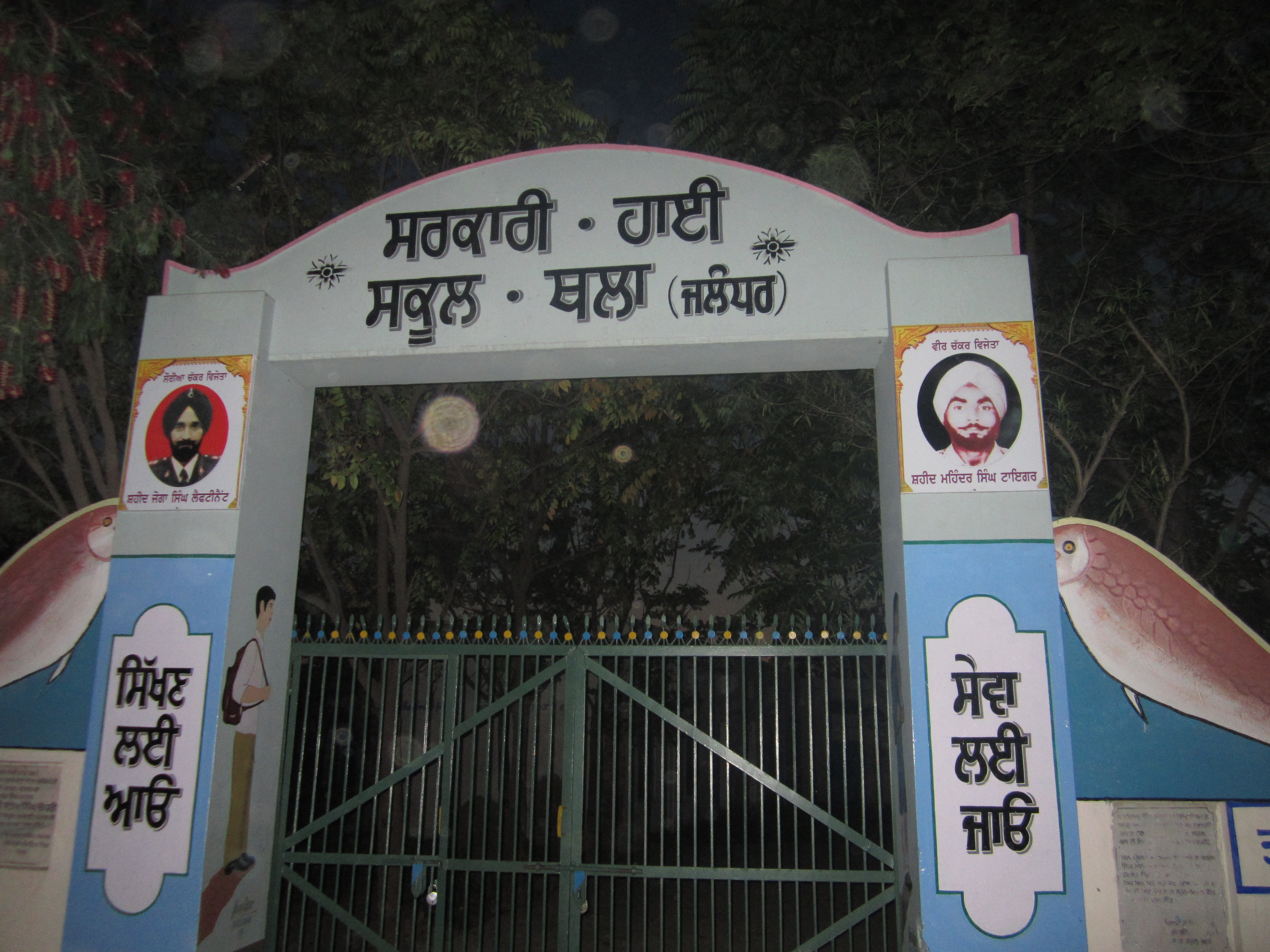
Government High School, Thalla

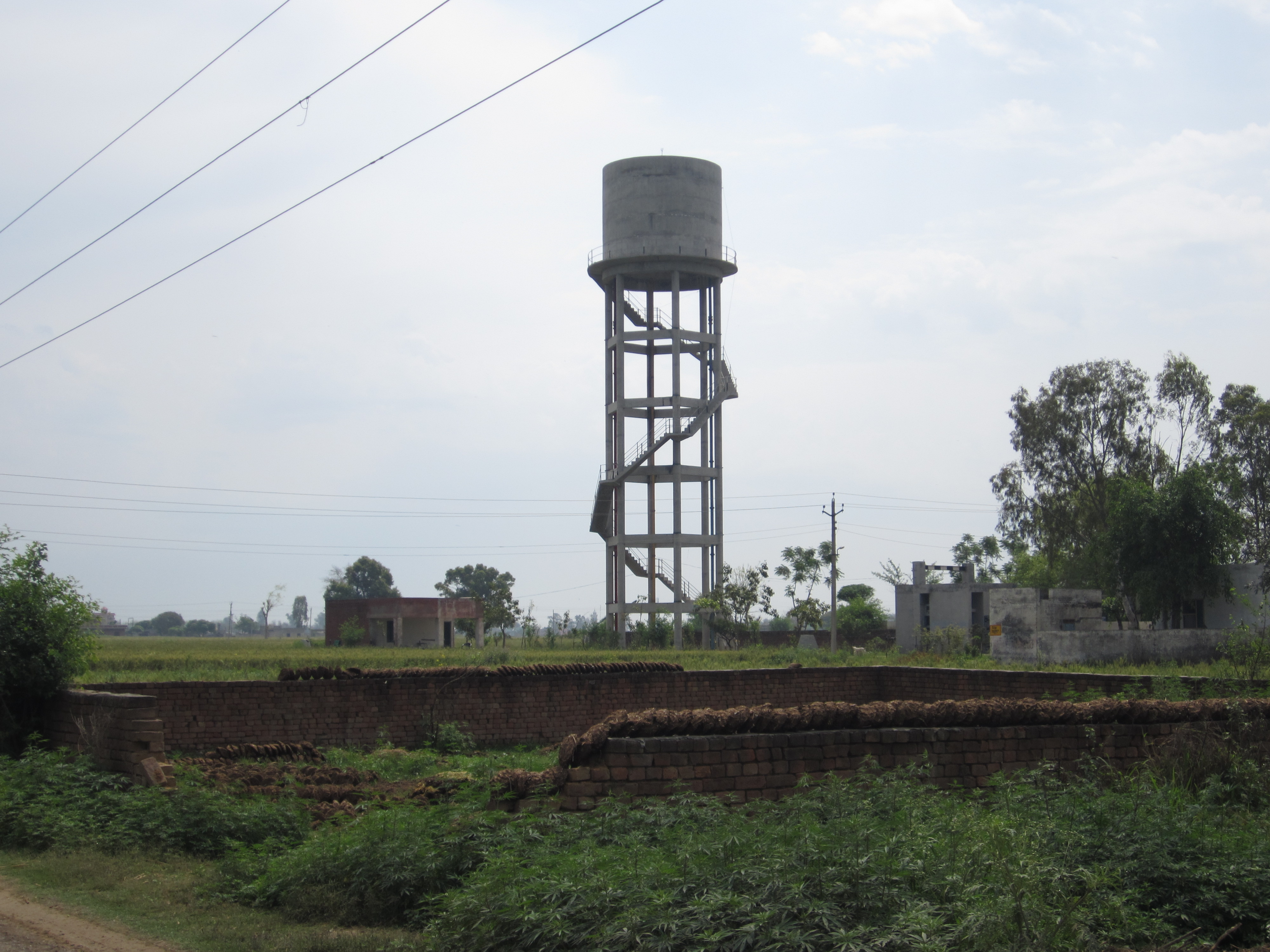
Water Tank

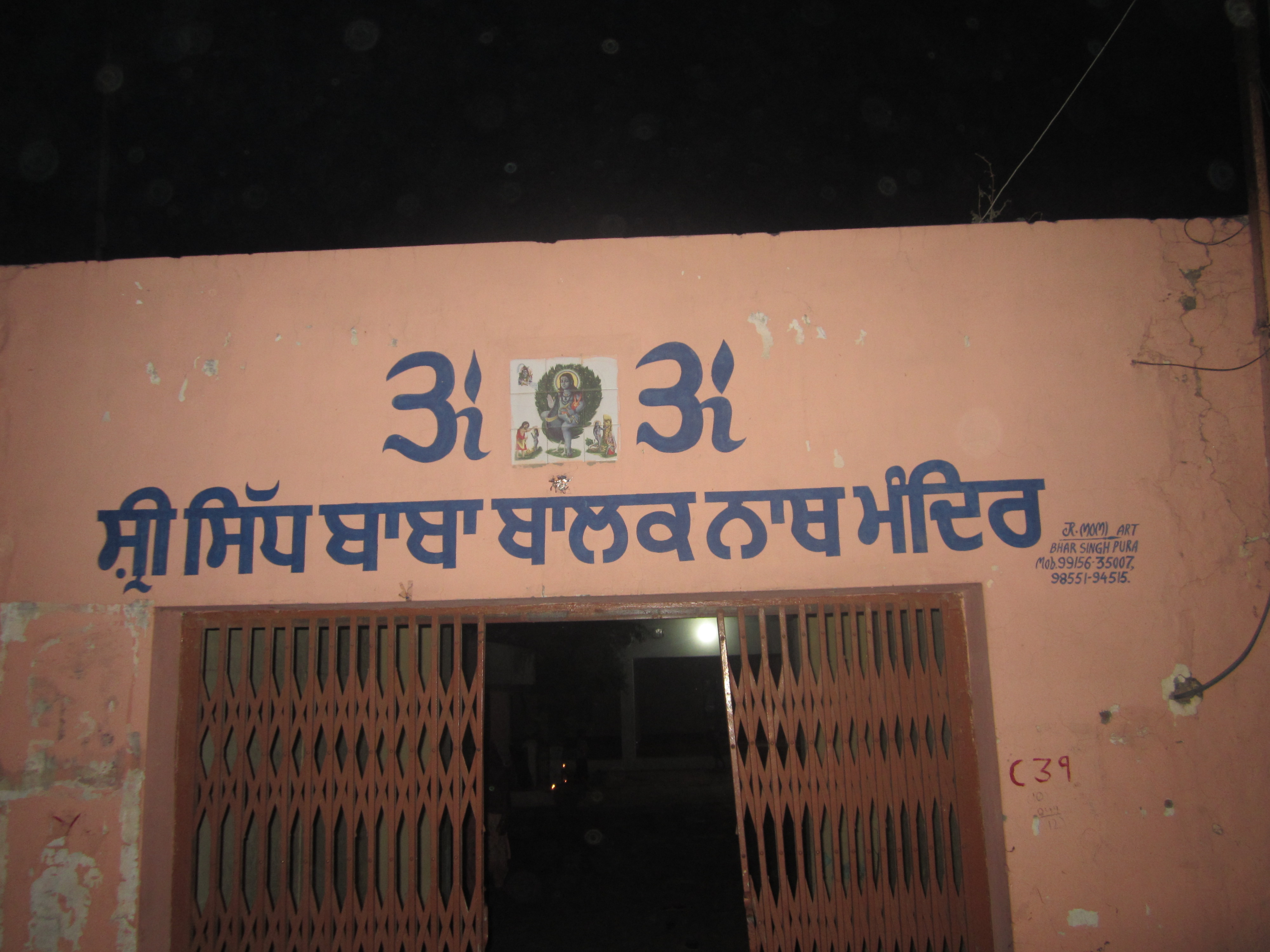
Baba Balak Nath Mandir
