= Dalla, Punjab =

Dalla
- Village
- Location in Punjab, India Dalla (India)
- Coordinates: 31.068784°N 75.584296°E
- Country: India
- State: Punjab
- District: Jalandhar
- Tehsil: Phillaur

Government
  - Type: Panchayat raj
  - Body: Gram panchayat
- Elevation: 246 m (807 ft)

Population (2011)
  - Total: 1,247
- Sex ratio 651/596 ♂/♀

Languages
  - Official: Punjabi
- Time zone: UTC+5:30 (IST)
- PIN: 144039
- ISO 3166 code: IN-PB
- Vehicle registration: PB 37
- Website: jalandhar.nic.in

Dalla is a village in Phillaur tehsil in Jalandhar district of Punjab State, India. It is located 3 km from Nurmahal, 23 km from Phillaur, 32 km from district headquarter Jalandhar and 133 km from state capital Chandigarh. The village is administrated by a sarpanch who is an elected representative of village as per Panchayati raj (India).There is also Similar name village near Bholath named Dalla (Punjabi: ਡਾਲਾ).

== Demography ==
As of 2011, Dalla has a total number of 238 houses and population of 1247 of which 651 are males while 596 are females according to the report published by Census India in 2011. Literacy rate of Dalla is 80.09%, higher than state average of 75.84%. The population of children under the age of 6 years is 117 which is 9.38% of total population of Dalla, and child sex ratio is approximately 696 higher than state average of 846.

Most of the people are from Schedule Caste which constitutes 26.06% of total population in Dalla. The town does not have any Schedule Tribe population so far.

As per census 2011, 441 people were engaged in work activities out of the total population of Dalla which includes 387 males and 54 females. According to census survey report 2011, 95.01% workers describe their work as main work and 4.99% workers are involved in marginal activity providing livelihood for less than 6 months.

== Transport ==
Nurmagal railway station is the nearest train station; however, Phillaur Junction train station is 23 km away from the village. The village is 53 km away from domestic airport in Ludhiana and the nearest international airport is located in Chandigarh also Sri Guru Ram Dass Jee International Airport is the second nearest airport which is 128 km away in Amritsar.

== Places of Importance ==
Jathere of CHHURA's community Bibi Ji Temple (Bibi ji ka mela (fair)) is organised in the village and people from far away places visit the place.
