= Sampli =

- village
- Location in Punjab, India Sampli (India)
- Coordinates: 30°40′22″N 76°33′2″E
- Country: India
- State: Punjab
- District: Fatehgarh Sahib

Area
  - Total: 12 km^{2} (4.6 sq mi)

Population (2001)
  - Total: 1,269
  - Density: 110/km^{2} (270/sq mi)

Languages
  - Official: Punjabi
- Time zone: UTC+5:30 (IST)
- Telephone code: 01763
- Vehicle registration: PB23
- Nearest city: Bassi Pathana
- Sex ratio: 1.14 ♂/♀
- Literacy: 23%
- Lok Sabha constituency: Fatehgarh Sahib
- Vidhan Sabha constituency: Sirhind

Sampli (Saimply Sahib) is a small village in the Bassi Pathana block of Fatehgarh Sahib district, in the Indian state of Punjab. This village is approximately 25 kilometres from Chandigarh, the capital of Punjab, 45 km from Patiala-academic city of Punjab, and about 75 km from Ludhiana, the industrial city of Punjab.

== Demographics ==
As of 2001 it had a population of in households. and the main profession of people is agriculture and Service. The population mainly consists of Sikhs and 2-3 families of Muslims.

It is a religious village and known for popular Gurudwara Saimply Sahib. Brahm Giani Sant Baba Jaimal Singh Ji built this Gurudwara Sahib. Sant Baba Banta is now in charge of Gurughar. Prominent figures Sant Jarnail Singh Bhindranwale and Giani Jail Singh (Ex President of India) were frequent visitors to this village.
