= Bhandal Himmat =

- Village
- Location in Punjab, India Bhandal Himmat (India)
- Coordinates: 31.1262297°N 75.5705551°E
- Country: India
- State: Punjab
- District: Jalandhar

Government
  - Type: Panchayat raj
  - Body: Gram panchayat
- Elevation: 246 m (807 ft)

Population (2011)
  - Total: 942
- Sex ratio 493/449 ♂/♀

Languages
  - Official: Punjabi
- Time zone: UTC+5:30 (IST)
- PIN: 144039
- ISO 3166 code: IN-PB
- Vehicle registration: PB- 08
- Website: jalandhar.nic.in

Bhandal Himmat is a village in the Jalandhar district of Punjab State, India. It is located 10.7 km away from Nakodar, 26.7 km from Phillaur, and 27 km from the district headquarters. Jal S, Jalandhar, 136 km from state capital ⁣⁣Chandigarh The village is administered by a sarpanch, who is an elected representative of the village as per Panchayati raj (India ).

== Demography ==
As of 2011, Bhandal Himmat has a total number of 195 houses and a population of 942, of which 493 are males and 449 are females according to the report published by Census India in 2011. LThe lieracy rate of Bhandal Himmat is 77.70%, higher than sthe sate average of 75.84%. The population of children under the age of 6 years is 90 , hich is 9.55% of tohe toal population of Bhandal Himmat, and cthe cild sex ratio is approximately 1195 as compared to Pthe Pnjab state average of 846.

Most of the people are from Schedule Caste, which constitutes 54.99% of tohe toal population in Bhandal Himmat. The town does not have any Schedule Tribe population so far.

Per the 2011 census, 357 people were engaged in work activities out of the total population of Bhandal Himmat, which includes 338 males and 19 females. According to the 2011 census survey report, 98.88% of workers describe their work as their main work, and 1.12% of workers are involved in marginal activity providing livelihood for less than 6 months.

== Education ==
The village has a co-ed upper primary with a secondary school founded in 1972. The school provides a mid-day meal as per the Indian Midday MealScheme [2]e.

== Transport ==
=== Rail ===
Nurmahal train station is the nearest train station however, Phillaur Junction railway station is 26 km away from the village.

=== Air ===
The nearest domestic airport is located 56.4 km away in Ludhiana and the nearest international airport is located in Chandigarh . Also,Sri Guru Ram Dass Jee International Airport is the second nearest airport ,which is 123 km away in Amritsar.
