= Chhokran =

- Village
- Location in Punjab, India Chhokran (India)
- Coordinates: 31.0890446°N 75.897778°E
- Country: India
- State: Punjab
- District: Jalandhar
- Tehsil: Phillaur
- Elevation: 246 m (807 ft)

Population (2011)
  - Total: 2,298
- Sex ratio 1179/1119 ♂/♀

Languages
  - Official: Punjabi
  - Other spoken: Hindi
- Time zone: UTC+5:30 (IST)
- PIN: 144029
- Telephone code: 01826
- ISO 3166 code: IN-PB
- Vehicle registration: PB 37
- Post office: Moron
- Website: jalandhar.nic.in

Chhokran is a village in Jalandhar District of Punjab State, India. The village is administrated by Sarpanch who is elected representative of village. It is located 3.8 km (2.4 mi) away from census town Apra. Chhokran is located 45 km towards East from Jalandhar, 17.5 km (10.9 mi) from Phillaur and 120 km (75 mi) from Chandigarh. The nearest train station is situated 23 km (14 mi) away in Phillaur, nearest domestic airport is at Ludhiana and the nearest international airport is 139 km (86 mi) away in Amritsar. The village has postal head office 1 km (0.62 mi) away in Moron.

== Caste ==
The village has schedule caste (SC) constitutes 50.87% of total population of the village and it doesn't have any Schedule Tribe (ST) population.

== Education ==
The village has Government primary school (GPS) and it is a Punjabi Medium, Co-educational school. The nearest high school located 1 km in Moron and 2 km away in Apra.
