= Ghurka, Punjab =

Ghurka
- Village
- Location in Punjab, India Ghurka (India)
- Coordinates: 31.1546623°N 75.7367662°E
- Country: India
- State: Punjab
- District: Jalandhar

Government
  - Type: Panchayat raj
  - Body: Gram panchayat
- Elevation: 240 m (790 ft)

Population (2011)
  - Total: 2,924
- Sex ratio 1513/1311 ♂/♀

Languages
  - Official: Punjabi
- Time zone: UTC+5:30 (IST)
- PIN: 144632
- Telephone: 01826
- ISO 3166 code: IN-PB
- Vehicle registration: PB- 08
- Post Office: Ghurka
- Website: jalandhar.nic.in

Ghurka is a village in Jalandhar district of Punjab State, India. It is located 5.5 km away from Rurka Kalan, 19 km from Phillaur, 33.4 km from district headquarter Jalandhar and 136 km from state capital Chandigarh. The village is administrated by a sarpanch who is an elected representative of village as per Panchayati raj (India).

== Education ==
The village has a Punjabi medium, co-ed upper primary with secondary school (GHS Ghurka). The school provide mid-day meal as per Indian Midday Meal Scheme and the meal prepared in school premises and it was found in 1974.

== Facilities ==
The village has one bank: Canara Bank with ATM facility.

== Demography ==
According to the report published by Census India in 2011, Ghurka has a total number of 627 houses and population of 2,924 of which include 1513 males and 1311 females. Literacy rate of Ghurka is 76.18%, higher than state average of 75.84%. The population of children under the age of 6 years is 271 which is 9.27% of total population of Ghurka, and child sex ratio is approximately 1101 higher than state average of 897.

Most of the people are from Schedule Caste which constitutes 57.97% of total population in Ghurka. The town does not have any Schedule Tribe population so far.

As per census 2011, 1099 people were engaged in work activities out of the total population of Ghurka which includes 913 males and 186 females. According to census survey report 2011, 66.97% workers describe their work as main work and 33.03% workers are involved in marginal activity providing livelihood for less than 6 months.

== Transport ==
Goraya and Phagwara railway stations are the nearest train station. However, Phillaur Junction train station is 19 km away from the village. The village is 49.2 km away from domestic airport in Ludhiana and the nearest international airport is located in Chandigarh also Sri Guru Ram Dass Jee International Airport is the second nearest airport which is 136 km away in Amritsar.
