= Aujla Jogi =

- Village
- Location in Punjab, India Aujla Jogi (India)
- Coordinates: 31.333459°N 75.415535°E
- Country: India
- State: Punjab
- District: Kapurthala

Government
  - Type: Panchayati raj (India)
  - Body: Gram panchayat

Population (2011)
  - Total: 951
- Sex ratio 462/489♂/♀

Languages
  - Official: Punjabi
  - Other spoken: Hindi
- Time zone: UTC+5:30 (IST)
- PIN: 144601
- Telephone code: 01822
- ISO 3166 code: IN-PB
- Vehicle registration: PB-09
- Website: kapurthala.gov.in

Aujla Jogi is a village in Kapurthala district of Punjab State, India. It is located 6 kilometres (3.7 mi) from Kapurthala, which is both its district and sub-district headquarters. The village is administrated by a Sarpanch, who is an elected representative.

== History ==
Aujla Jogi, Kapurthala is over 200 years old and was founded by two brothers of the Aujla clan. These brothers were Sardar Joga Singh Aujla and Sardar Banwal Singh Aujla. They were the grandsons of Sardar Jassa Singh Ahluwalia who had conquered Kapurthala decades before their birth. Sardar Joga Singh Aujla had 12 sons and Sardar Banwal Singh Aujla had 10 sons.

== Demography ==
According to the report published by Census India in 2011, Aujla Jogi has a total number of 218 houses and population of 951 of which include 462 males and 489 females. Literacy rate of Aujla Jogi is 77.56%, higher than state average of 75.84%. The population of children under the age of 6 years is 91 which is 9.57% of total population of Aujla Jogi, and child sex ratio is approximately 1068 higher than state average of 846.

== Transport ==
The closest airport to the village is Sri Guru Ram Dass Jee International Airport.
