= Jajja Khurd =

- Village
- Location in Punjab, India Jajja Khurd (India)
- Coordinates: 31.0838621°N 75.8487403°E
- Country: India
- State: Punjab
- District: Jalandhar
- Tehsil: Phillaur
- Elevation: 246 m (807 ft)

Population (2011)
  - Total: 959

Languages
  - Official: Punjabi
  - Other spoken: Hindi
- Time zone: UTC+5:30 (IST)
- PIN: 144418
- Telephone code: 01826
- ISO 3166 code: IN-PB
- Vehicle registration: PB 37
- Website: jalandhar.nic.in

Jajja Khurd is a village (Pind) 2 km from the market town of Apra and within close proximity of Phagwara, Phillaur, Goraya and Banga. Kalan is Persian language word which means Big and Khurd is Persian word which means small when two villages have same name then it is distinguished with Kalan means Big and Khurd means Small used with Village Name. It is within the Doaba region of Punjab in India in the Jalandhar district, close to the boundary of Nawanshahr district. There is a majority of Garcha/Sandhu surnames residing in the village.

A large Gurudwara (Sikh Temple) is present as you enter Jajja from Apra.

The closest train station is situated 8 km away in the town of Goraya.

== People of Jajja Khurd ==
The people of Jajja Khurd are considered by many as traditional Punjabis, they are known to be very conservative in their values and although a large percentage of the population has emigrated to Europe and North America; they tend not adopt western culture fully i.e. continue the tradition of arranged marriage, females tend not consume alcohol as per traditional Punjabi values.
