= Partabpura =

Partabpura ਪ੍ਰਤਾਬਪੁਰਾ Partappura
- Village
- Nickname: ( also it is well known as Mao-Partappura so that people do not make mistake to luhar-Partappura )
- Location in Punjab, India Partabpura (India)
- Coordinates: 31.0437165°N 75.7101827°E
- Country: India
- State: Punjab
- District: Jalandhar

Languages
  - Official: Punjabi
- Time zone: UTC+5:30 (IST)
- PIN: 144035
- Telephone code: 1826

Partabpura is a village in Jalandhar District of Punjab.

== Overview ==
Partabpura is on the Phillaur-Nurmahal road, close to Bilga village. Partabpura is well linked by road with Nurmahal, Phillaur, Bilga and other neighboring villages and towns. It has historical gurudwaras, mandirs and mosques. Village is divided in 4 portions (portion of a village is known as a patti) which have their own specific names.

Partabpura Railway Station serves this area. Phillaur is nearest railway junction. The nearest airport is at Ludhiana.

Partabura consists of 2500 homes and is the biggest village in the immediate area.

== Geography ==
Partabpura is located at 31.04°N 75.71°E.It has an average elevation of 243 metres (797 feet).

== Schools and college ==
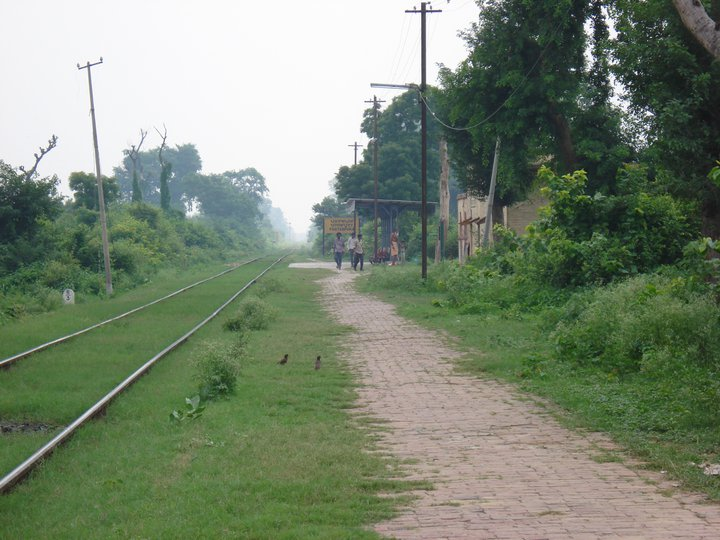
Partabpura Railway Station

- Govt. Primary School
- Guru Nanak Academy
- SBS Evershine Convent School
- Govt. Sen. Sec. School
- I.T.I. College

== PIN Code & STD Code ==
Partabpura's PIN code and STD code are 144035 & 01826 respectively.
