= Dayalpur =

- Village
- Country: India
- State: Punjab
- District: Jalandhar

Languages
  - Official: Punjabi
- Time zone: UTC+5:30 (IST)
- PIN: 144419
- ISO 3166 code: IN-PB

Dayalpur is a village in Phillaur. Phillaur is a city in the district Jalandhar of Indian state of Punjab.

== About ==
Dayalpur lies on the Phillaur-Nawa Shahar road which is almost 2 km from it. The nearest railway station to Diyalpur is Phillaur railway station at a distance of 14 km. Dayalpur Village was established around 1704.

== Post code ==
Dayalpur's Post code is 144419
