= Phillaur =

Phillaur Phulnagar
- Town
- Location in Punjab, India Phillaur (India)
- Coordinates: 31.03°N 75.78°E
- Country: India
- State: Punjab
- District: Jalandhar
- Established: 12th century
- Founder: Chaudhary Phul Rai Sanghera Jatt
- Elevation: 234 m (768 ft)

Population (2021)
  - Total: 178,198
- Time zone: UTC+5:30 (IST)
- PIN: 144410
- Telephone code: 1826
- Vehicle registration: PB 37

Phillaur is a town and a municipal council as well as a tehsil in Jalandhar district in the Indian state of Punjab. The city is situated 20 km from Ludhiana, 45 km from Jalandhar and 140 km from Amritsar. It is situated on the border of the Doaba and Puadh regions.

== Overview ==
Phillaur is the railway junction on the border line of Ludhiana Main and Ludhiana Cantonment (older spelling: Ludhiana). It was a junction for Lohian Khas and Ferozepur. During the pre-partition days, it was the main timber market of the Punjab Region. It is situated on the banks of River Satluj, the southernmost of the five rivers of the Punjab region. The timber that was cut in the higher regions of the Shivalik range was thrown into the River Satluj and then collected at Phillaur for further transportation. The dedicated railway line survives to this day but it is not functional. The town stands on the highway of tgr traditional Grand Trunk Road (G. T. Road or Sher Suri Marg, now National Highway 1 - NH. 1). The actual G. T. Road passes through Phillaur. The older route of the actual G. T. Road still survives along the railway bridge that connects the city to Ludhiana.

== History ==
This town was named by a Sanghera Jat called Phul who had named it Phulnagar. later Jatts left and Naru rajputs, sent by Rai Shahr, inhabited this town when Shahr's son Ratan Pal left Mau and settled in Phillaur later rajpiuts too left this town. During the reign of Sher Shah Suri (1540-1545 A. D.), a Sarai (for trading and military purpose) was raised at Phillaur. The Sarai was again revived by the Mughal Emperor Shahjahan (1627-1657 A. D.) later during the misl Era Sardar Sudh Singh Kang (Kakrah) captured it made it his headquarters. in 1907 Maharaja Ranjit Singh captured it. After the Treaty of Amritsar of 1809 between Ranjit Singh and the British East India Company, it became the border post of the Sikh Empire of Ranjit Singh. It was managed by Raja Dhanpat Rai who also acted as Ranjit Singh's munshi for the lands across the River Satluj which were part of Ludhiana (made a military cantonment by the British in 1842). The Sarai was converted into a fort as an outpost. Presently, the fort is called Ranjit Singh Fort. It is now being used as a Police Training Academy. The Finger Print Bureau (1892) in the police academy is one of the oldest forensic institutions in the region. It is also the birthplace of the famous Pakistani poet Sher Muhammad Khan, better known by his pen name, Ibn-e-Insha.

== Geography ==
Phillaur is located at 31.03°N 75.78°E. It has an average elevation of 234 metres (767 feet).

== Demographics ==
As of 2021 India census, Phillaur had a population of 178,198. Males constitute 54% of the population and females 46%. Phillaur has an average literacy rate of 83.16%, higher than state average of 75.84%. male literacy is 87.07%, and female literacy is 78.88%. In Phillaur, 11% of the population is under 6 years of age.

== Composition of Jai Jagdish Hare ==
The popular Hindu hymn Jai Jagdish Hare was composed by a local scholar Shardha Ram Phillauri in Phillaur some time in the 1870s. The exact date is not known. Shardha Ram Phillauri also wrote what is generally considered to the first novel in Hindi. There is a memorial commemorating him.

== Villages in Phillaur Tehsil ==
- Achan Chak
- Ajtani
- Akalpur
- Apra
- Asapur
- Atta
- Atti
- Aujla
- Bhadarpur
- Bhaini
- Bhallowal
- Bharampuri
- Burj Pukhta
- Bashchowal
- Begkampur
- Bansian Dhak
- Bara Pind
- Bhar Singh Pura
- Bhandal Himmat
- Bhattiya
- Bilga
- Bundala
- Bachhowal
- Chak Sahbu
- Chhokran
- Dalla
- Danduwal
- Gag Alias Dhagara
- Ganna Pind
- Garha
- Garhi Mahan Singh
- Ghurka
- Goraya
- Gorsian Nihal
- Hardo Sangha
- Haripur Khalsa
- Jajja Khurd
- Jandiala
- Kalayanpur
- Kamboj
- Katpalon
- Khaira
- Kot Badal Khan
- Kang Jagir
- Katana
- Khanpur
- Khela
- Khojpur
- Khokewal
- Lohgarh
- Landhra
- Lallian
- Mao Sahib
- Mau
- Mianwal
- Moron
- Mandi
- Nagar
- Nahal
- Nangal
- Nurewal
- Phalpota
- Pal Qadiam
- Palnau
- Paddi khalsa
- Panj Dhera
- Partabpura
- Pasla
- Pharwala
- Qadian
- Ramgarh
- Rurka Kalan
- Rurkee
- Raipur Araiyan
- Rasulpur
- Sultanpur
- Sailkiyana
- Shahpur
- Saidowal
- Saifabad
- Sangatpur
- Sailkiana
- Samrari
- Sarhal Mund
- Shahpur
- Sunner Kalan
- Taggar
- Talwan
- Tehang
- Turan
- Tehsil
- Thalla
- Uppal Jagir
