= Surapur Theh =

- Village
- Location in Punjab, India Surapur Theh (India)
- Coordinates: 31.1275447°N 75.9726953°E
- Country: India
- State: Punjab
- District: Shaheed Bhagat Singh Nagar

Government
  - Type: Panchayat raj
  - Body: Gram panchayat
- Elevation: 251 m (823 ft)

Population (2011)
  - Total: 71
- Sex ratio 39/32 ♂/♀

Languages
  - Official: Punjabi
- Time zone: UTC+5:30 (IST)
- PIN: 144506
- Telephone code: 01884
- ISO 3166 code: IN-PB
- Post office: Mahil Gailan
- Website: nawanshahr.nic.in

Surapur Theh is a village in Shaheed Bhagat Singh Nagar district of Punjab State, India. It is located 6 kilometres (3.7 mi) away from Banga, 17 kilometres (11 mi) from Nawanshahr, 10 kilometres (6.2 mi) from district headquarter Shaheed Bhagat Singh Nagar and 110 kilometres (68 mi) from state capital Chandigarh. The village is administrated by Sarpanch an elected representative of the village.

== Demography ==
As of 2011, Surapur Theh has a total number of 14 houses and population of 71 of which 39 include are males while 32 are females according to the report published by Census India in 2011. The literacy rate of Surapur Theh is 74.24% lower than the state average of 75.84%. The population of children under the age of 6 years is 5 which is 7.04% of total population of Surapur Theh, and child sex ratio is approximately 1500 as compared to Punjab state average of 846.

As per the report published by Census India in 2011, 23 people were engaged in work activities out of the total population of Surapur Theh which includes 23 males and 0 females. According to census survey report 2011, 100% workers describe their work as main work and 0% workers are involved in Marginal activity providing livelihood for less than 6 months.

== Education ==
The village has no school and children either travel or walk to other villages for schooling often covering between 8–10 kilometres (5.0–6.2 mi). Amardeep Singh Shergill Memorial college Mukandpur are the nearest colleges. Industrial Training Institute for women (ITI Nawanshahr) is 21 kilometres (13 mi). The village is 86 kilometres (53 mi) away from Chandigarh University, 68 kilometres (42 mi) from Indian Institute of Technology and 36 kilometres (22 mi) away from Lovely Professional University.

List of schools nearby:

- Punjabi medium, co-ed upper primary school, Bharo Mazara
- Punjabi medium, girls only upper primary with secondary school, Khan Khana
- Punjabi medium, boys-only primary school, Khan Khana
- Punjabi medium, co-ed primary school, Gosal
- Punjabi medium, co-ed alimentary school, Mazara Nauabad

== Transport ==
Banga train station is the nearest train station however, Phagwara Junction railway station is 25 kilometres (16 mi) away from the village. Sahnewal Airport is the nearest domestic airport which located 54 kilometres (34 mi) away in Ludhiana and the nearest international airport is located in Chandigarh also Sri Guru Ram Dass Jee International Airport is the second nearest airport which is 145 kilometres (90 mi) away in Amritsar.

== See also ==
- List of villages in India
