= Sarhal Qazian =

- Village
- Location in Punjab, India Sarhal Qazian (India)
- Coordinates: 31.1550158°N 75.9085299°E
- Country: India
- State: Punjab
- District: Shaheed Bhagat Singh Nagar

Government
  - Type: Panchayat raj
  - Body: Gram panchayat
- Elevation: 254 m (833 ft)

Population (2011)
  - Total: 1,543
- Sex ratio 790/753 ♂/♀

Languages
  - Official: Punjabi
- Time zone: UTC+5:30 (IST)
- PIN: 144502
- Telephone code: 01823
- ISO 3166 code: IN-PB
- Post office: Sarhal Qazian (B.O)
- Website: nawanshahr.nic.in

Sarhal Qazian is a village in Shaheed Bhagat Singh Nagar district of Punjab State, India. It is located 11.8 kilometres (7.3 mi) away from Banga, 25.8 kilometres (16.0 mi) from Nawanshahr, 21.3 kilometres (13.2 mi) from district headquarter Shaheed Bhagat Singh Nagar and 115 kilometres (71 mi) from state capital Chandigarh. The village is administrated by Sarpanch an elected representative of the village.

== Demography ==
As of 2011, Sarhal Qazian has a total number of 329 houses and population of 1543 of which 790 include are males while 753 are females according to the report published by Census India in 2011. The literacy rate of Sarhal Qazian is 77.10% higher than the state average of 75.84%. The population of children under the age of 6 years is 150 which is 9.72% of total population of Sarhal Qazian, and child sex ratio is approximately 1113 as compared to Punjab state average of 846.

Most of the people are from Schedule Caste which constitutes 80.23% of total population in Sarhal Qazian. The town does not have any Schedule Tribe population so far.

As per the report published by Census India in 2011, 478 people were engaged in work activities out of the total population of Sarhal Qazian which includes 437 males and 41 females. According to census survey report 2011, 90.38% workers describe their work as main work and 9.62% workers are involved in Marginal activity providing livelihood for less than 6 months.

== Education ==
The village has two elementary schools and one Senior Secondary school for grade 6 through 12 . Amardeep Singh Shergill Memorial college Mukandpur are the nearest colleges. Industrial Training Institute for women (ITI Nawanshahr) is 26 kilometres (16 mi). The village is 98 kilometres (61 mi) away from Chandigarh University, 73 kilometres (45 mi) from Indian Institute of Technology and 28 kilometres (17 mi) away from Lovely Professional University.

List of schools nearby

- Govt Upper Primary School, Katt
- Govt Upper Primary with Secondary School, Khan Khana (girls only)
- Govt Primary School, Khan Khana (boys only)
- Govt Upper Primary School, Sotran

== Transport ==
Banga train station is the nearest train station however, Phagwara Junction railway station is 19 kilometres (12 mi) away from the village. Sahnewal Airport is the nearest domestic airport which located 51 kilometres (32 mi) away in Ludhiana and the nearest international airport is located in Chandigarh also Sri Guru Ram Dass Jee International Airport is the second nearest airport which is 136 kilometres (85 mi) away in Amritsar.

== See also ==
- List of villages in India
