= Gehal Mazari =

- Village
- Location in Punjab, India Gehal Mazari (India)
- Coordinates: 31.1427234°N 75.9663624°E
- Country: India
- State: Punjab
- District: Shaheed Bhagat Singh Nagar

Government
  - Type: Panchayat raj
  - Body: Gram panchayat
- Elevation: 254 m (833 ft)

Population (2011)
  - Total: 572
- Sex ratio 284/288 ♂/♀

Languages
  - Official: Punjabi
- Time zone: UTC+5:30 (IST)
- PIN: 144507
- Telephone code: 01823
- ISO 3166 code: IN-PB
- Post office: Mukandpur
- Website: nawanshahr.nic.in

Gehal Mazari is a village in Shaheed Bhagat Singh Nagar district of Punjab State, India. It is located 5.7 kilometres (3.5 mi) away from Banga, 20 kilometres (12 mi) from Nawanshahr, 11.6 kilometres (7.2 mi) from district headquarter Shaheed Bhagat Singh Nagar and 110 kilometres (68 mi) from state capital Chandigarh. The village is administrated by Sarpanch an elected representative of the village.

== Demography ==
As of 2011, Gehal Mazari has a total number of 132 houses and population of 572 of which 284 include are males while 288 are females according to the report published by Census India in 2011. The literacy rate of Gehal Mazari is 77.43%, higher than the state average of 75.84%. The population of children under the age of 6 years is 58 which is 10.14% of total population of Gehal Mazari, and child sex ratio is approximately 1071 as compared to Punjab state average of 846.

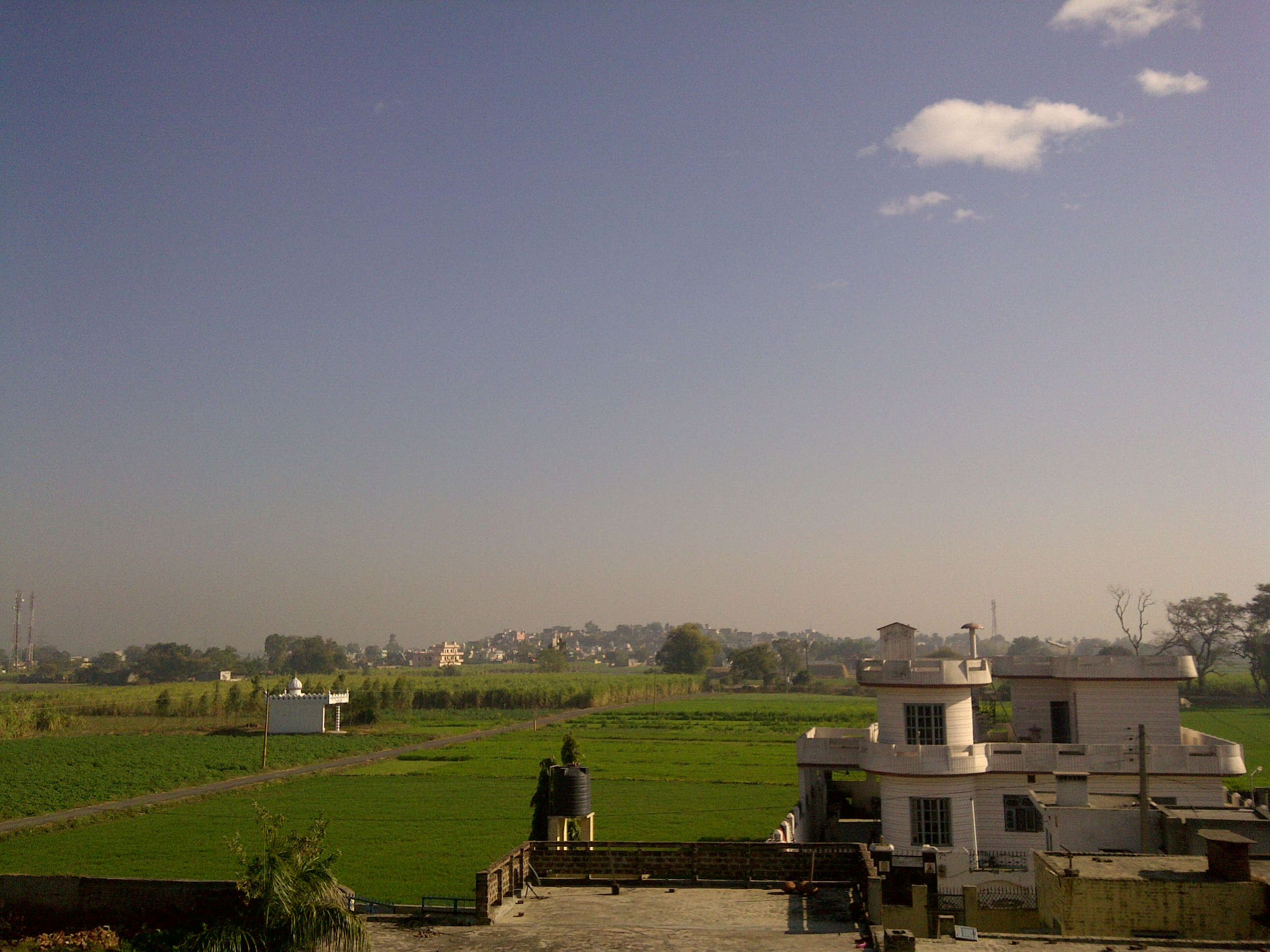
Sunny Day in Gehal Mazari, Punjab

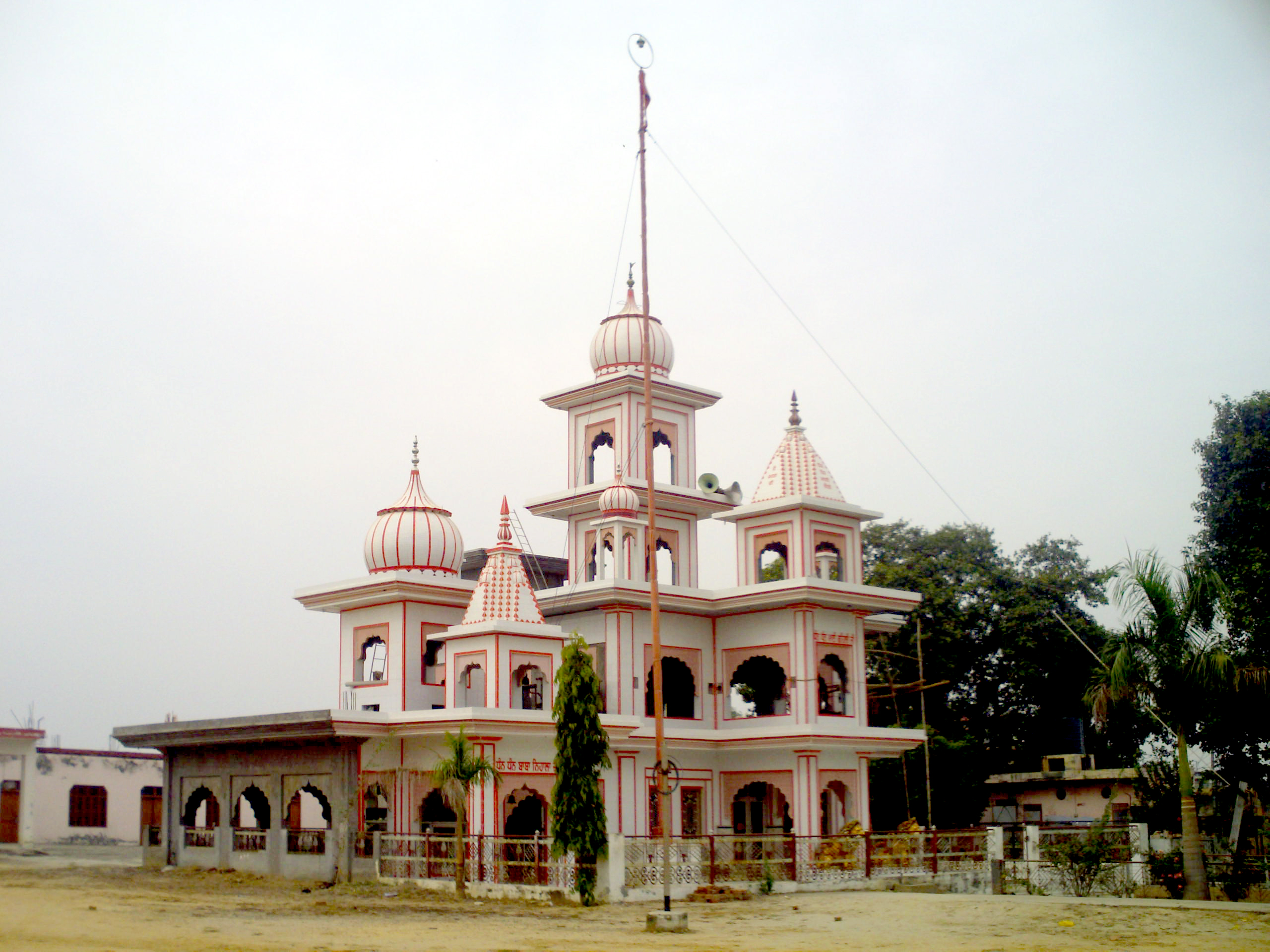
Mai Gehli Temple in Gehal Mazari, Punjab

Most of the people are from Schedule Caste which constitutes 58.04% of total population in Gehal Mazari. The town does not have any Schedule Tribe population so far.

As per the report published by Census India in 2011, 159 people were engaged in work activities out of the total population of Gehal Mazari which includes 155 males and 4 females. According to census survey report 2011, 100% workers describe their work as main work and 0% workers are involved in Marginal activity providing livelihood for less than 6 months.

== Education ==
Amardeep Singh Shergill Memorial college Mukandpur and Sikh National College Banga are the nearest colleges. Lovely Professional University is 33.8 kilometres (21.0 mi) away from the village.

List of schools nearby:

- Guru Nanak Mission Public Sr Sec School, Dhahan
- Sat Modern Public School, Mangat Dingrian
- Guru Teg Bahadur Model School, Behram
- Guru Ram Dass Public School, Cheta
- Lovely Public School, Pathlawa
- Govt Senior Secondary Smart School, Mukandpur

== Transport ==
Banga railway station is the nearest train station however, Phagwara Junction railway station is 25 kilometres (16 mi) away from the village. Sahnewal Airport is the nearest domestic airport which located 53 kilometres (33 mi) away in Ludhiana and the nearest international airport is located in Chandigarh also Sri Guru Ram Dass Jee International Airport is the second nearest airport which is 145 kilometres (90 mi) away in Amritsar.

== See also ==
- List of villages in India
