= Hamirowal =

- Village
- Location in Punjab, India Hamirowal (India)
- Coordinates: 31.1762047°N 75.9892776°E
- Country: India
- State: Punjab
- District: Shaheed Bhagat Singh Nagar

Government
  - Type: Panchayat raj
  - Body: Gram panchayat
- Elevation: 251 m (823 ft)

Population (2011)
  - Total: 515
- Sex ratio 257/258 ♂/♀

Languages
  - Official: Punjabi
- Time zone: UTC+5:30 (IST)
- PIN: 144505
- Telephone code: 01823
- ISO 3166 code: IN-PB
- Post office: Banga
- Website: nawanshahr.nic.in

Hamirowal is a village in Shaheed Bhagat Singh Nagar district of Punjab State, India. It is located 1 kilometre (0.62 mi) away from Banga, 17 kilometres (11 mi) from Mukandpur, 11 kilometres (6.8 mi) from district headquarter Shaheed Bhagat Singh Nagar and 105 kilometres (65 mi) from state capital Chandigarh. The village is administrated by Sarpanch an elected representative of the village.

== Demography ==
As of 2011, Hamirowal had a total number of 117 houses and a population of 515, of which 257 were males and 258 were females, according to the report published by Census India in 2011. The literacy rate of Hamirowal is 73.03%, lower than the state average of 75.84%. The population of children under the age of 6 years is 59, which is 11.46% of total population of Hamirowal, and child sex ratio is approximately 1034 as compared to Punjab state average of 846.

Most of the people are from Schedule Caste which constitutes 83.50% of total population in Hamirowal. The town does not have any Schedule Tribe population so far.

As per the report published by Census India in 2011, 178 people were engaged in work activities out of the total population of Hamirowal which includes 157 males and 21 females. According to census survey report 2011, 98.31% workers describe their work as main work and 1.69% workers are involved in Marginal activity providing livelihood for less than 6 months.

== Education ==
Amardeep Singh Shergill Memorial college Mukandpur, Sikh National College Banga and Guru Nanak College of Nursing in Dhahan are the nearest colleges. Lovely Professional University is 32 kilometres (20 mi) away from the village.

== Transport ==
Banga railway station is the nearest train station however, Garhshankar Junction railway station is 18 kilometres (11 mi) away from the village. Sahnewal Airport is the nearest domestic airport which located 58 kilometres (36 mi) away in Ludhiana and the nearest international airport is located in Chandigarh also Sri Guru Ram Dass Jee International Airport is the second nearest airport which is 140 kilometres (87 mi) away in Amritsar.

== See also ==
- List of villages in India
