= Sheikhupur, SBS Nagar =

Sheikhupur
- Village
- Location in Punjab, India Sheikhupur (India)
- Coordinates: 31.0940609°N 75.9597294°E
- Country: India
- State: Punjab
- District: Shaheed Bhagat Singh Nagar
- Founder: Sh. Ashok Rana(DELHI WALE)

Government
  - Type: Panchayat raj
  - Body: Gram panchayat

Population (2011)
  - Total: 2,209
- Sex ratio 1055/1154 ♂/♀

Languages
  - Official: Punjabi
- Time zone: UTC+5:30 (IST)
- 01823: 144029
- Telephone code: 01823
- ISO 3166 code: IN-PB
- Vehicle registration: PB32
- Post office: Sheikhupur (B.O)
- Website: nawanshahr.nic.in

Sheikhupur is a village in Shaheed Bhagat Singh Nagar district of Punjab State, India. It is located 13 kilometres (8.1 mi) away from Banga, 16 kilometres (9.9 mi) from Nawanshahr, 9 kilometres (5.6 mi) from district headquarter Shaheed Bhagat Singh Nagar and 108 kilometres (67 mi) from state capital Chandigarh. The village is administrated by Sarpanch an elected representative of the village.

== Demography ==
As of 2011, Sheikhupur has a total number of 429 houses and population of 2209 of which 1055 include are males while 1154 are females according to the report published by Census India in 2011. The literacy rate of Sheikhupur is 78.19% higher than the state average of 75.84%. The population of children under the age of 6 years is 251 which is 11.36% of total population of Sheikhupur, and child sex ratio is approximately 859 as compared to Punjab state average of 846.

Most of the people are from Schedule Caste which constitutes 42.69% of total population in Sheikhupur. The town does not have any Schedule Tribe population so far.

As per the report published by Census India in 2011, 652 people were engaged in work activities out of the total population of Sheikhupur which includes 602 males and 46 females. According to census survey report 2011, 90.03% workers describe their work as main work and 9.97% workers are involved in Marginal activity providing livelihood for less than 6 months.

== Education ==
The village has no school and children either travel or walk to other villages for schooling often covering between 8–10 kilometres (5.0–6.2 mi). KC Engineering College and Doaba Khalsa Trust Group Of Institutions are the nearest colleges. Industrial Training Institute for women (ITI Nawanshahr) is 19 kilometres (12 mi). The village is 83 kilometres (52 mi) away from Chandigarh University, 65 kilometres (40 mi) from Indian Institute of Technology and 33 kilometres (21 mi) away from Lovely Professional University.

List of schools nearby

- Govt Upper Primary School, Katt
- Govt Upper Primary with Secondary School, Khan Khana (girls only)
- Govt Primary School, Khan Khana (boys only)
- Govt Upper Primary School, Sotran

== Transport ==
Banga train station is the nearest train station however, Phagwara Junction railway station is 26 kilometres (16 mi) away from the village. Sahnewal Airport is the nearest domestic airport which located 52 kilometres (32 mi) away in Ludhiana and the nearest international airport is located in Chandigarh also Sri Guru Ram Dass Jee International Airport is the second nearest airport which is 143 kilometres (89 mi) away in Amritsar.

== See also ==
- List of villages in India
