= Bir Sarangwal =

- Village
- Location in Punjab, India Bir Sarangwal (India)
- Coordinates: 31.2249187°N 75.8272602°E
- Country: India
- State: Punjab
- District: Shaheed Bhagat Singh Nagar

Government
  - Type: Panchayat raj
  - Body: Gram panchayat
- Elevation: 254 m (833 ft)

Population (2011)
  - Total: 52
- Sex ratio 31/21 ♂/♀

Languages
  - Official: Punjabi
- Time zone: UTC+5:30 (IST)
- PIN: 144501
- Telephone code: 01884
- ISO 3166 code: IN-PB
- Post office: Kultham
- Website: nawanshahr.nic.in

Bir Sarangwal is a village in Shaheed Bhagat Singh Nagar district of Punjab State, India. It is located 11 kilometres (6.8 mi) away from Phagwara, 16 kilometres (9.9 mi) from Banga, 30 kilometres (19 mi) from district headquarter Shaheed Bhagat Singh Nagar and 120 kilometres (75 mi) from state capital Chandigarh. The village is administrated by Sarpanch an elected representative of the village.

== Demography ==
As of 2011, Bir Sarangwal has a total number of 18 houses and a population of 52 of which 31 include are males while 21 are females according to the report published by Census India in 2011. The literacy rate of Bir Sarangwal is 60.47%, higher than the state average of 75.84%. The population of children under the age of 6 years is 9 which is 17.31% of total population of Bir Sarangwal, and child sex ratio is approximately 1250 as compared to Punjab state average of 846.

Most of the people are from Schedule Caste in Bir Sarangwal. The town does not have any Schedule Tribe population so far.

As per the report published by Census India in 2011, 26 people were engaged in work activities out of the total population of Bir Sarangwal which includes 20 males and 6 females. According to census survey report 2011, 100% workers describe their work as main work and 0% workers are involved in Marginal activity providing livelihood for less than 6 months.

== Education ==
Amardeep Singh Shergill Memorial college Mukandpur and Sikh National College Banga are the nearest colleges. Lovely Professional University is 20 kilometres (12 mi) away from the village.

List of schools nearby:

- Sat Modern Public School, Mangat Dingrian
- Guru Teg Bahadur Model School, Behram
- Guru Ram Dass Public School, Cheta
- Lovely Public School, Pathlawa

== Transport ==
Banga railway station is the nearest train station however, Phagwara Junction railway station is 12 kilometres (7.5 mi) away from the village. Sahnewal Airport is the nearest domestic airport which located 61 kilometres (38 mi) away in Ludhiana and the nearest international airport is located in Chandigarh also Sri Guru Ram Dass Jee International Airport is the second nearest airport which is 128 kilometres (80 mi) away in Amritsar.

== See also ==
- List of villages in India
