= Bains, Nawanshar =

Bains
- Village
- Location in Punjab, India Bains (India)
- Coordinates: 31.170535°N 76.055552°E
- Country: India
- State: Punjab
- District: Shaheed Bhagat Singh Nagar

Government
  - Type: Panchayat raj
  - Body: Gram panchayat
- Elevation: 254 m (833 ft)

Population (2011)
  - Total: 2,064
- Sex ratio 1058/1006 ♂/♀

Languages
  - Official: Punjabi
- Time zone: UTC+5:30 (IST)
- PIN: 144508
- Telephone code: 01884
- ISO 3166 code: IN-PB
- Post office: Naura
- Website: nawanshahr.nic.in

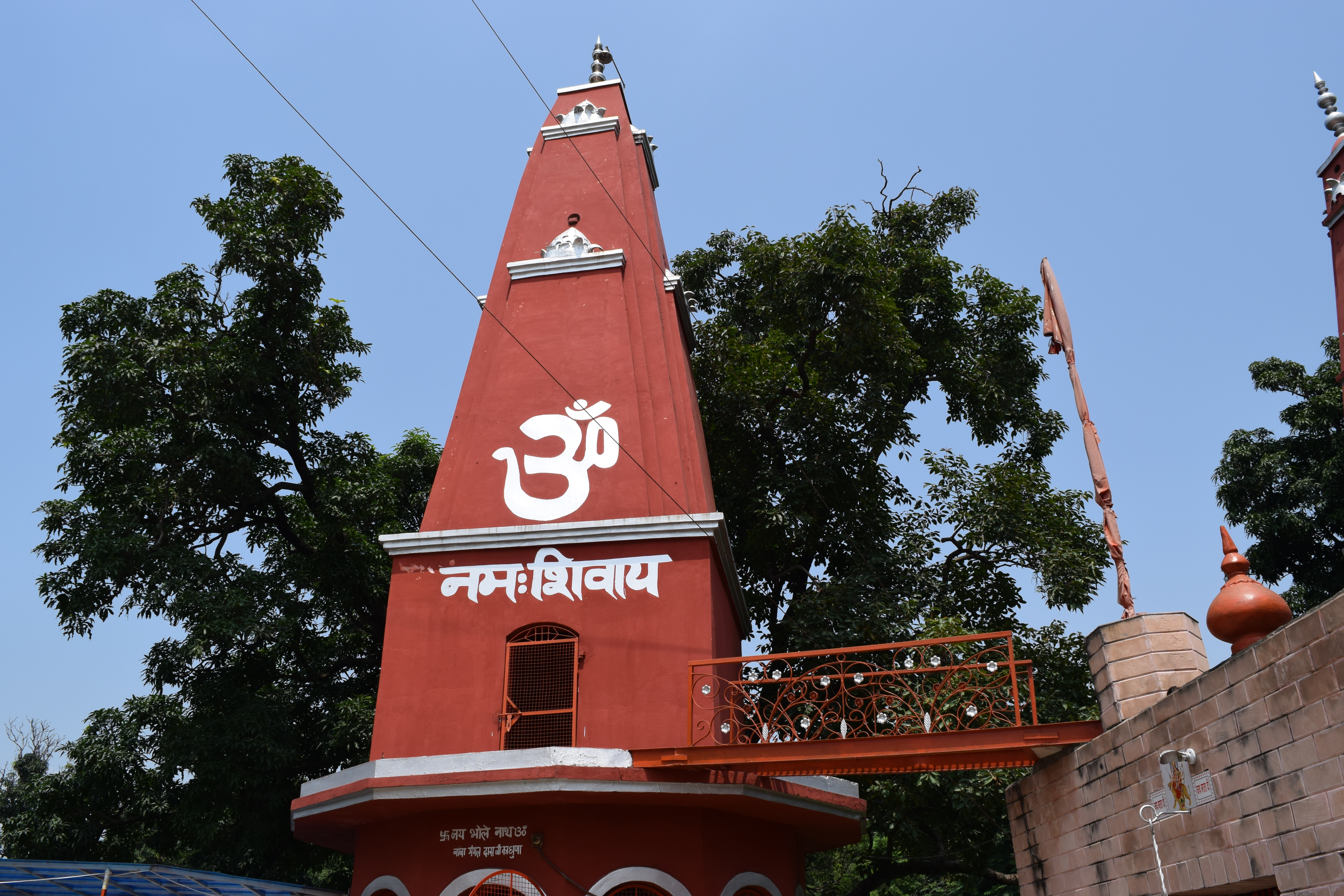
Shri Baba Mangal Das Ji Shrine in Maheshiyana Mandir, Bainsa.

Bains is a village in Shaheed Bhagat Singh Nagar district of Punjab State, India. It is located 2.8 kilometres (1.7 mi) away from postal head office Naura, 6.6 kilometres (4.1 mi) from Banga, 9 kilometres (5.6 mi) from district headquarter Shaheed Bhagat Singh Nagar and 98 kilometres (61 mi) from state capital Chandigarh. The village is administrated by Sarpanch an elected representative of the village.

== Demography ==
As of 2011, Bains has a total number of 438 houses and population of 2064 of which 1058 include are males while 1006 are females according to the report published by Census India in 2011. The literacy rate of Bains is 75.81%, lower than the state average of 75.84%. The population of children under the age of 6 years is 204 which is 9.88% of total population of Bains, and child sex ratio is approximately 821 as compared to Punjab state average of 846.

As per the report published by Census India in 2011, 637 people were engaged in work activities out of the total population of Bains which includes 566 males and 71 females. According to census survey report 2011, 58.40% workers describe their work as main work and 41.60% workers are involved in Marginal activity providing livelihood for less than 6 months.

== Education ==
The village has a Punjabi medium, co-ed upper primary school founded in 1975. The schools provide mid-day meal as per Indian Midday Meal Scheme. The school provide free education to children between the ages of 6 and 14 as per Right of Children to Free and Compulsory Education Act.

Amardeep Singh Shergill Memorial college Mukandpur and Sikh National College Banga are the nearest colleges. Lovely Professional University is 37 kilometres (23 mi) away from the village.

== Landmarks ==
Baliyana Mandir, Maheshiyana Mandir and Baba Mangal Das Mandir are religious sites in the village.

== Transport ==
Kariha railway station is the nearest train station however, Phagwara Junction railway station is 29 kilometres (18 mi) away from the village. Sahnewal Airport is the nearest domestic airport which located 64 kilometres (40 mi) away in Ludhiana and the nearest international airport is located in Chandigarh also Sri Guru Ram Dass Jee International Airport is the second nearest airport which is 146 kilometres (91 mi) away in Amritsar.

== See also ==
- List of villages in India
