= Bakhlaur =

- Village
- Location in Punjab, India Bakhlaur (India)
- Coordinates: 31.0755877°N 75.9457611°E
- Country: India
- State: Punjab
- District: Nawanshahr

Government
  - Type: Panchayat raj
  - Body: Gram panchayat
- Elevation: 251 m (823 ft)

Population (2011)
  - Total: 3,226
- Sex ratio 1617/1609 ♂/♀

Languages
  - Official: Punjabi
- Time zone: UTC+5:30 (IST)
- PIN: 144422
- Telephone code: 01823
- ISO 3166 code: IN-PB
- Post office: Urapar
- Website: nawanshahr.nic.in

Bakhlaur is a village of Nawanshahr in Punjab State, India. It is located 5 kilometres (3.1 mi) away from postal head office Urapar, 9.6 kilometres (6.0 mi) from Apra, 21.4 kilometres (13.3 mi) from district headquarter Shaheed Bhagat Singh Nagar and 110 kilometres (68 mi) from state capital Chandigarh. The village is administrated by Sarpanch an elected representative of the village.

== Demography ==
As of 2011, Bakhlaur has a total number of 641 houses and population of 3226 of which 1617 include are males while 1609 are females according to the report published by Census India in 2011. The literacy rate of Bakhlaur is 78.18%, higher than the state average of 75.84%. The population of children under the age of 6 years is 339 which is 10.51% of total population of Bakhlaur, and child sex ratio is approximately 852 as compared to Punjab state average of 846.

As per the report published by Census India in 2011, 928 people were engaged in work activities out of the total population of Bakhlaur which includes 799 males and 129 females. According to census survey report 2011, 58.41% workers describe their work as main work and 51.49% workers are involved in Marginal activity providing livelihood for less than 6 months.

== Education ==
The village has a Punjabi medium, co-ed upper primary with secondary school founded in 1968. The schools provide mid-day meal as per Indian Midday Meal Scheme. As per Right of Children to Free and Compulsory Education Act the school provide free education to children between the ages of 6 and 14. The village also has a Punjabi medium, co-ed primary with upper primary and secondary/higher secondary private school which was founded in 1984, and provide education from class 1 to 12.

Sikh National College Banga and Amardeep Singh Shergill Memorial college Mukandpur are the nearest colleges. Lovely Professional University is 36 kilometres (22 mi) away from the village.

== Transport ==
Banga train station is the nearest train station however, Nawanshahr railway station is 20 kilometres (12 mi) away from the village. Sahnewal Airport is the nearest domestic airport which located 48 kilometres (30 mi) away in Ludhiana and the nearest international airport is located in Chandigarh also Sri Guru Ram Dass Jee International Airport is the second nearest airport which is 144 kilometres (89 mi) away in Amritsar.

== See also ==
- List of villages in India
