= Mazara Nauabad =

- Village
- Location in Punjab, India Mazara Nauabad (India)
- Coordinates: 31.1443582°N 75.9901704°E
- Country: India
- State: Punjab
- District: Shaheed Bhagat Singh Nagar

Government
  - Type: Panchayat raj
  - Body: Gram panchayat
- Elevation: 254 m (833 ft)

Population (2011)
  - Total: 1,182
- Sex ratio 612/570 ♂/♀

Languages
  - Official: Punjabi
- Time zone: UTC+5:30 (IST)
- PIN: 144511
- Telephone code: 01823
- ISO 3166 code: IN-PB
- Post office: Dosanjh Khurd
- Website: nawanshahr.nic.in

Mazara Nauabad or Mazara Nau Abad is a village in Shaheed Bhagat Singh Nagar district of Punjab State, India. It is located 5.2 kilometres (3.2 mi) away from Banga, 15.8 kilometres (9.8 mi) from Apra, 8.5 kilometres (5.3 mi) from district headquarter Shaheed Bhagat Singh Nagar and 108 kilometres (67 mi) from state capital Chandigarh. The village is administrated by Sarpanch an elected representative of the village.

== Demography ==
As of 2011, Mazara Nauabad has a total number of 260 houses and population of 1182 of which 612 include are males while 570 are females according to the report published by Census India in 2011. The literacy rate of Mazara Nauabad is 83.07%, higher than the state average of 75.84%. The population of children under the age of 6 years is 119 which is 10.07% of total population of Mazara Nauabad, and child sex ratio is approximately 859 as compared to Punjab state average of 846.

Most of the people are from Schedule Caste which constitutes 47.21% of total population in Mazara Nauabad. The town does not have any Schedule Tribe population so far.

As per the report published by Census India in 2011, 378 people were engaged in work activities out of the total population of Mazara Nauabad which includes 337 males and 41 females. According to census survey report 2011, 91.01% workers describe their work as main work and 8.99% workers are involved in Marginal activity providing livelihood for less than 6 months.

== Education ==
The village has a Punjabi medium, co-ed alimentary school. The schools provide mid-day meal as per Indian Midday Meal Scheme. The school provide free education to children between the ages of 6 and 14 as per Right of Children to Free and Compulsory Education Act. Amardeep Singh Shergill Memorial college Mukandpur and Sikh National College Banga are the nearest colleges.

== Landmarks and history ==
The village has a shrine Gurudwara Rasokhana Nabh Kanwal Raja Sahib which situated on Karnana-Gunachaur road. In 1940, Nabh Kanwal Raja Sahib who was an Indian spiritual master, regarded by his devotees as a saint, fakir and satguru died in this village and his body was cremated at the same place used to called Takht of Nabh Kanwal Raja Sahib and later it was converted into a tomb. Some of the good has been preserved which was used by Nabh Kanwal Raja Sahib. A religious fair held at the Gurdwara annually, which attended by people of all religions.

== Transport ==
Banga railway station is the nearest train station however, Nawanshahr railway station is 28 kilometres (17 mi) away from the village. Sahnewal Airport is the nearest domestic airport which located 56 kilometres (35 mi) away in Ludhiana and the nearest international airport is located in Chandigarh also Sri Guru Ram Dass Jee International Airport is the second nearest airport which is 144 kilometres (89 mi) away in Amritsar.

== See also ==
- List of villages in India
