= Bahar Mazara =

- Village
- Location in Punjab, India Bahar Mazara (India)
- Coordinates: 31.2047034°N 75.8461439°E
- Country: India
- State: Punjab
- District: Shaheed Bhagat Singh Nagar

Government
  - Type: Panchayat raj
  - Body: Gram panchayat
- Elevation: 254 m (833 ft)

Population (2011)
  - Total: 1,165
- Sex ratio 610/555 ♂/♀

Languages
  - Official: Punjabi
- Time zone: UTC+5:30 (IST)
- PIN: 144501
- Telephone code: 01884
- ISO 3166 code: IN-PB
- Post office: Kultham
- Website: nawanshahr.nic.in

Bahar Mazara also spelled as Bahar Majara is a village in Shaheed Bhagat Singh Nagar district of Punjab State, India. It is located 1.4 kilometres (0.87 mi) away from postal head office Kultham, 15 kilometres (9.3 mi) from Banga, 29 kilometres (18 mi) from district headquarter Shaheed Bhagat Singh Nagar and 119 kilometres (74 mi) from state capital Chandigarh. The village is administrated by Sarpanch an elected representative of the village.

== Demography ==
As of 2011, Bahar Mazara has a total number of 260 houses and a population of 1165 of which 610 include are males while 555 are females according to the report published by Census India in 2011. The literacy rate of Bahar Mazara is 81.35%, higher than the state average of 75.84%. The population of children under the age of 6 years is 130 which is 11.16% of total population of Bahar Mazara, and child sex ratio is approximately 831 as compared to Punjab state average of 846.

Most of the people are from Schedule Caste which constitutes 58.63% of total population in Bahar Mazara. The town does not have any Schedule Tribe population so far.

As per the report published by Census India in 2011, 358 people were engaged in work activities out of the total population of Bahar Mazara which includes 348 males and 10 females. According to census survey report 2011, 100% workers describe their work as main work and 0% workers are involved in Marginal activity providing livelihood for less than 6 months.

== Education ==
The village has a Punjabi medium, co-ed upper primary school founded in 1955. The schools provide mid-day meal as per Indian Midday Meal Scheme. The school provide free education to children between the ages of 6 and 14 as per Right of Children to Free and Compulsory Education Act.

Amardeep Singh Shergill Memorial college Mukandpur and Sikh National College Banga are the nearest colleges. Lovely Professional University is 17 kilometres (11 mi) away from the village.

== Transport ==
Kulthamabdullashah Halt railway station is the nearest train station however, Phagwara Junction railway station is 10 kilometres (6.2 mi) away from the village. Sahnewal Airport is the nearest domestic airport which located 63 kilometres (39 mi) away in Ludhiana and the nearest international airport is located in Chandigarh also Sri Guru Ram Dass Jee International Airport is the second nearest airport which is 125 kilometres (78 mi) away in Amritsar.

== See also ==
- List of villages in India
