= Lal Mazara =

- Village
- Location in Punjab, India Lal Mazara (India)
- Coordinates: 31.1225501°N 75.9921842°E
- Country: India
- State: Punjab
- District: Shaheed Bhagat Singh Nagar

Government
  - Type: Panchayat raj
  - Body: Gram panchayat
- Elevation: 254 m (833 ft)

Population (2011)
  - Total: 598
- Sex ratio 291/307 ♂/♀

Languages
  - Official: Punjabi
- Time zone: UTC+5:30 (IST)
- PIN: 144511
- Telephone code: 01823
- ISO 3166 code: IN-PB
- Post office: Dosanjh Khurd
- Website: nawanshahr.nic.in

Lal Mazara also spelled as Lalo Mazara is a village in Shaheed Bhagat Singh Nagar district of Punjab State, India. It is located 8.4 kilometres (5.2 mi) away from postal head office Dosanjh Khurd, 14.6 kilometres (9.1 mi) from Nawanshahr, 7.4 kilometres (4.6 mi) from district headquarter Shaheed Bhagat Singh Nagar and 108 kilometres (67 mi) from state capital Chandigarh. The village is administrated by Sarpanch an elected representative of the village.

== Demography ==
As of 2011, Lal Mazara has a total number of 118 houses and population of 598 of which 291 include are males while 307 are females according to the report published by Census India in 2011. The literacy rate of Lal Mazara is 80.91%, higher than the state average of 75.84%. The population of children under the age of 6 years is 48 which is 8.03% of total population of Lal Mazara, and child sex ratio is approximately 1667 as compared to Punjab state average of 846.

Most of the people are from Schedule Caste which constitutes 45.99% of total population in Lal Mazara. The town does not have any Schedule Tribe population so far.

As per the report published by Census India in 2011, 170 people were engaged in work activities out of the total population of Lal Mazara which includes 164 males and 6 females. According to census survey report 2011, 98.82% workers describe their work as main work and 1.18% workers are involved in Marginal activity providing livelihood for less than 6 months.

== Education ==
Amardeep Singh Gill Memorial college Mukandpur and Sikh National College Banga are the nearest colleges. Industrial Training Institute for women (ITI Nawanshahr) is 17 kilometres (11 mi) The village is 69 kilometres (43 mi) from Indian Institute of Technology and 35.6 kilometres (22.1 mi) away from Lovely Professional University.

== Transport ==
Banga railway station is the nearest train station, However, Garhshankar Junction train station is 25.5 kilometres (15.8 mi) away from the village. Sahnewal Airport is the nearest domestic airport located 55.5 kilometres (34.5 mi) away in Ludhiana and the nearest international airport is located in Chandigarh also Sri Guru Ram Dass Jee International Airport is the second nearest airport which is 148 kilometres (92 mi) away in Amritsar.

== See also ==
- List of villages in India
