= Bisla =

- Village
- Location in Punjab, India Bisla (India)
- Coordinates: 31.2029616°N 75.9283289°E
- Country: India
- State: Punjab
- District: Shaheed Bhagat Singh Nagar

Government
  - Type: Panchayat raj
  - Body: Gram panchayat
- Elevation: 254 m (833 ft)

Population (2011)
  - Total: 1,295
- Sex ratio 640/656 ♂/♀

Languages
  - Official: Punjabi
- Time zone: UTC+5:30 (IST)
- PIN: 144505
- Telephone code: 01884
- ISO 3166 code: IN-PB
- Post office: Banga
- Website: nawanshahr.nic.in

Bisla is a village in Shaheed Bhagat Singh Nagar district of Punjab State, India. The village is administrated by Sarpanch an elected representative of the village.

== Demography ==
As of 2011, Bisla has a total number of 298 houses and population of 1296 of which 640 include are males while 656 are females according to the report published by Census India in 2011. The literacy rate of Bisla is 79.83%, higher than the state average of 75.84%. The population of children under the age of 6 years is 111 which is 8.56% of total population of Bisla, and child sex ratio is approximately 1018 as compared to Punjab state average of 846.

Most of the people are from Schedule Caste which constitutes 57.25% of total population in Bisla. The town does not have any Schedule Tribe population so far.

As per the report published by Census India in 2011, 439 people were engaged in work activities out of the total population of Bisla which includes 367 males and 72 females. According to census survey report 2011, 100% workers describe their work as main work and 0% workers are involved in Marginal activity providing livelihood for less than 6 months.

== Education ==
Amardeep Singh Shergill Memorial college Mukandpur and Sikh National College Banga are the nearest colleges. Lovely Professional University is 26 kilometres (16 mi) away from the village.

== Transport ==
Banga railway station is the nearest train station however, Phagwara Junction railway station is 18 kilometres (11 mi) away from the village. Sahnewal Airport is the nearest domestic airport which located 67 kilometres (42 mi) away in Ludhiana and the nearest international airport is located in Chandigarh also Sri Guru Ram Dass Jee International Airport is the second nearest airport which is 134 kilometres (83 mi) away in Amritsar.

== See also ==
- List of villages in India
