= Chak Ramun =

- Village
- Location in Punjab, India Chak Ramun (India)
- Coordinates: 31.1732647°N 75.8849702°E
- Country: India
- State: Punjab
- District: Shaheed Bhagat Singh Nagar

Government
  - Type: Panchayat raj
  - Body: Gram panchayat
- Elevation: 251 m (823 ft)

Population (2011)
  - Total: 1,196
- Sex ratio 612/684 ♂/♀

Languages
  - Official: Punjabi
- Time zone: UTC+5:30 (IST)
- PIN: 144504
- Telephone code: 01884
- ISO 3166 code: IN-PB
- Post office: Behram
- Website: nawanshahr.nic.in

Chak Ramun is a village in Shaheed Bhagat Singh Nagar district of Punjab State, India. It is located 3.5 kilometres (2.2 mi) away from postal head office Behram, 13 kilometres (8.1 mi) from Banga, 24 kilometres (15 mi) from district headquarter Shaheed Bhagat Singh Nagar and 117 kilometres (73 mi) from state capital Chandigarh. The village is administrated by Sarpanch an elected representative of the village.

== Demography ==
As of 2011, Chak Ramun has 252 houses and population of 1196 of which 612 include are males while 584 are females according to the report published by Census India in 2011. The literacy rate of Chak Ramun is 83.46%, higher than the state average of 75.84%. The population of children under the age of 6 years is 120 which is 10.03% of total population of Chak Ramun, and child sex ratio is approximately 1034 as compared to Punjab state average of 846.

Most of the people are from Schedule Caste which constitutes 43.06% of total population in Chak Ramun. The town does not have any Schedule Tribe population so far.

As per the report published by Census India in 2011, 353 people were engaged in work activities out of the total population of Chak Ramun which includes 335 males and 18 females. According to census survey report 2011, 90.65% workers describe their work as main work and 9.35% workers are involved in Marginal activity providing livelihood for less than 6 months.

== Education ==
The village has a Punjabi medium, co-ed upper primary with secondary/higher secondary school founded in 1920. The schools provide mid-day meal as per Indian Midday Meal Scheme and the meal prepared in school premises. As per Right of Children to Free and Compulsory Education Act the school provide free education to children between the ages of 6 and 14.

Amardeep Singh Shergill Memorial college Mukandpur and Sikh National College Banga are the nearest colleges. Lovely Professional University is 24.6 kilometres (15.3 mi) away from the village.

== Transport ==
Behram railway station is the nearest train station however, Phagwara Junction railway station is 16 kilometres (9.9 mi) away from the village. Sahnewal Airport is the nearest domestic airport which located 66 kilometres (41 mi) away in Ludhiana and the nearest international airport is located in Chandigarh also Sri Guru Ram Dass Jee International Airport is the second nearest airport which is 133 kilometres (83 mi) away in Amritsar.

== See also ==
- List of villages in India
