= Bagoran =

- Village
- Location in Punjab, India Bagoran (India)
- Coordinates: 31.1438747°N 75.9200552°E
- Country: India
- State: Punjab
- District: Shaheed Bhagat Singh Nagar

Government
  - Type: Panchayat raj
  - Body: Gram panchayat
- Elevation: 254 m (833 ft)

Population (2011)
  - Total: 486
- Sex ratio 246/240 ♂/♀

Languages
  - Official: Punjabi
- Time zone: UTC+5:30 (IST)
- PIN: 144507
- Telephone code: 01823
- ISO 3166 code: IN-PB
- Post office: Mukandpur
- Website: nawanshahr.nic.in

Bagoran also spelled as Baghoran is a village in Shaheed Bhagat Singh Nagar district of Punjab State, India. It is located 2.7 kilometres (1.7 mi) away from postal head office Mukandpur, 11.2 kilometres (7.0 mi) from Banga, 16.8 kilometres (10.4 mi) from district headquarter Shaheed Bhagat Singh Nagar and 92.5 kilometres (57.5 mi) from state capital Chandigarh. The village is administrated by Sarpanch an elected representative of the village.

== Demography ==
As of 2011, Bagoran has a total number of 94 houses and a population of 486 of which 246 include are males while 240 are females according to the report published by Census India in 2011. The literacy rate of Bagoran is 78.44%, higher than state average of 75.84%. The population of children under the age of 6 years is 50 which is 10.29% of total population of Bagoran, and child sex ratio is approximately 976 as compared to Punjab state average of 846. Most of the people are from Schedule Caste which constitutes 81.07% of total population in Bagoran. The town does not have any Schedule Tribe population so far.

Per census 2011, 145 people were engaged in work activities out of the total population of Bagoran which includes 130 males and 15 females. According to census survey report 2011, 89.66% workers describe their work as main work and 10.34% workers are involved in Marginal activity providing livelihood for less than 6 months.

== Education ==
The village has a Punjabi medium, co-ed primary and middle school. The school provide mid-day meal as per Indian Midday Meal Scheme and the meal prepared in school premises. As per Right of Children to Free and Compulsory Education Act the school provide free education to children between the ages of 6 and 14. The nearest college Amardeep Singh Shergill Memorial college is located 3 kilometres (1.9 mi) away in Mukandpur.

== Transport ==
Banga train station is the nearest train station however, Phagwara Junction railway station is 22.1 kilometres (13.7 mi) away from the village. Sahnewal Airport is the nearest domestic airport which located 51.8 kilometres (32.2 mi) away in Ludhiana and the nearest international airport is located in Chandigarh also Sri Guru Ram Dass Jee International Airport is the second nearest airport which is 138 kilometres (86 mi) away in Amritsar.

== See also ==
- List of villages in India
