= Godani, SBS Nagar =

Godani
- Village
- Location in Punjab, India Godani (India)
- Coordinates: 31.2180787°N 75.9111653°E
- Country: India
- State: Punjab
- District: Shaheed Bhagat Singh Nagar

Government
  - Type: Panchayat raj
  - Body: Gram panchayat
- Elevation: 254 m (833 ft)

Population (2011)
  - Total: 428
- Sex ratio 234/194 ♂/♀

Languages
  - Official: Punjabi
- Time zone: UTC+5:30 (IST)
- PIN: 144503
- ISO 3166 code: IN-PB
- Post office: Katarian
- Website: nawanshahr.nic.in

Godani is a village in Shaheed Bhagat Singh Nagar district of Punjab State, India. It is located 10 kilometres (6.2 mi) away from Banga, 24 kilometres (15 mi) from Nawanshahr, 21 kilometres (13 mi) from district headquarter Shaheed Bhagat Singh Nagar and 114 kilometres (71 mi) from state capital Chandigarh. The village is administrated by Sarpanch an elected representative of the village.

== Demography ==
As of 2011, Godani has a total number of 111 houses and population of 428 of which 234 include are males while 194 are females according to the report published by Census India in 2011. The literacy rate of Godani is 63.73%, lower than the state average of 75.84%. The population of children under the age of 6 years is 53 which is 12.38% of total population of Godani, and child sex ratio is approximately 1038 as compared to Punjab state average of 846.

Most of the people are from Schedule Caste which constitutes 54.44% of total population in Godani. The town does not have any Schedule Tribe population so far.

As per the report published by Census India in 2011, 181 people were engaged in work activities out of the total population of Godani which includes 153 males and 28 females. According to census survey report 2011, 99.45% workers describe their work as main work and 0.55% workers are involved in Marginal activity providing livelihood for less than 6 months.

== Education ==
Amardeep Singh Shergill Memorial college Mukandpur and Sikh National College Banga are the nearest colleges. Lovely Professional University is 33.8 kilometres (21.0 mi) away from the village.

== Transport ==
Banga railway station is the nearest train station however, Phagwara Junction railway station is 20 kilometres (12 mi) away from the village. Sahnewal Airport is the nearest domestic airport which located 69 kilometres (43 mi) away in Ludhiana and the nearest international airport is located in Chandigarh also Sri Guru Ram Dass Jee International Airport is the second nearest airport which is 136 kilometres (85 mi) away in Amritsar.

== See also ==
- List of villages in India
