= Jindowal =

- Village
- Location in Punjab, India Jindowal (India)
- Coordinates: 31.1814789°N 76.0068059°E
- Country: India
- State: Punjab
- District: Shaheed Bhagat Singh Nagar

Government
  - Type: Panchayat raj
  - Body: Gram panchayat
- Elevation: 251 m (823 ft)

Population (2011)
  - Total: 1,287
- Sex ratio 652/635 ♂/♀

Languages
  - Official: Punjabi
- Time zone: UTC+5:30 (IST)
- PIN: 144505
- Telephone code: 01884
- ISO 3166 code: IN-PB
- Post office: Banga
- Website: nawanshahr.nic.in

Jindowal is a village in Shaheed Bhagat Singh Nagar district of Punjab State, India. It is located 1.6 kilometres (0.99 mi) away from the postal head office in Banga, 15 kilometres (9.3 mi) from Garhshankar, 12 kilometres (7.5 mi) from the district headquarter Shaheed Bhagat Singh Nagar and 103 kilometres (64 mi) from the state capital Chandigarh. The village is administrated by a Sarpanch, an elected representative of the village.

== Demography ==
As of 2011, Jindowal has a total number of 263 houses and population of 1287 of which 652 include are males while 635 are females according to the report published by Census India in 2011. The literacy rate of Jindowal is 82.08%, higher than the state average of 75.84%. The population of children under the age of 6 years is 151 which is 11.97% of total population of Jindowal, and child sex ratio is approximately 855 as compared to Punjab state average of 846.

Almost 62% of the population are Jat Sikh. Majority of them are Banga, Chahal, Jindowal, Mahal. Less than half of the population is Schedule Caste which constitutes 38.00% of total population. The town does not have any Schedule Tribe population so far.

As per the report published by Census India in 2011, 402 people were engaged in work activities out of the total population of Jindowal which includes 348 males and 54 females. Many families have migrated to foreign countries but still hold their ancestral land. According to the census survey report of 2011, 96.27% workers describe their work as main work and 3.73% workers are involved in marginal activity providing livelihood for less than 6 months.

== Education ==
The village has a Punjabi medium, co-ed primary school founded in 1955. The schools provide mid-day meal as per Indian Midday Meal Scheme. As per Right of Children to Free and Compulsory Education Act the school provide free education to children between the ages of 6 and 14. Sikh National College Banga and Amardeep Singh Shergill Memorial college Mukandpur are the nearest colleges.

== Landmarks and history ==
The village has a historical Sikh shrine Gurudwara Charan Kanwal which was built by Maharaja Ranjit Singh in the memory of sixth Guru Hargobind Singh. Guru Hargobind Singh came to this village while on his way from Phagwara to Kirtarpur and stayed here for few days after killing Pende Khan in the last battle.

The village was named after a zamindar Jeeva whom Guru Hargobind Singh gave the blessing of milk while his stay in this village.

== Transport ==
Banga train station is the nearest train station. Nawanshahr railway station is also close by, 13 kilometres (8.1 mi) away from the village. Sahnewal Airport is the nearest domestic airport which is located 61 kilometres (38 mi) away in Ludhiana and the nearest international airport is located in Chandigarh. Sri Guru Ram Dass Jee International Airport is the second nearest airport which is 141 kilometres (88 mi) away in Amritsar.

== See also ==
- List of villages in India
