= Hapowal =

- Village
- Location in Punjab, India Hapowal (India)
- Coordinates: 31.2026064°N 75.9675407°E
- Country: India
- State: Punjab
- District: Shaheed Bhagat Singh Nagar

Government
  - Type: Panchayat raj
  - Body: Gram panchayat
- Elevation: 251 m (823 ft)

Population (2011)
  - Total: 1,142
- Sex ratio 562/580 ♂/♀

Languages
  - Official: Punjabi
- Time zone: UTC+5:30 (IST)
- PIN: 144505
- Telephone code: 01884
- ISO 3166 code: IN-PB
- Post office: Banga
- Website: nawanshahr.nic.in

Hapowal is a village in Shaheed Bhagat Singh Nagar district of Punjab State, India. It is located 3.6 kilometres (2.2 mi) away from postal head office Banga, 17 kilometres (11 mi) from Nawanshahr, 15 kilometres (9.3 mi) from district headquarter Shaheed Bhagat Singh Nagar, and 107 kilometres (66 mi) from state capital Chandigarh. The village is administrated by Sarpanch, an elected representative of the village.

== Demography ==
As of 2011, Hapowal has a total number of 277 houses and a population of 1,142 of which 562 are males while 580 are females, according to the report published by Census India in 2011. The literacy rate of Hapowal is 77.66%, higher than the state average of 75.84%. The population of children under the age of 6 years is 144 which is 12.61% of total population of Hapowal, and child sex ratio is approximately 1,215 as compared to Punjab state average of 846.

Most of the people are from Schedule Caste which constitutes 52.63% of total population in Hapowal. The town does not have any Schedule Tribe population so far.

As per the report published by Census India in 2011, 316 people were engaged in work activities out of the total population of Hapowal which includes 279 males and 37 females. According to census survey report 2011, 89.56% workers describe their work as main occupation, and 10.44% workers are involved in Marginal activity providing livelihood for less than 6 months.

== Education ==
The village has a Punjabi medium, co-ed primary school founded in 1957. The schools does not provide mid-day meal. The school provide free education to children between the ages of 6 and 14 as per Right of Children to Free and Compulsory Education Act.

Guru Nanak College of Nursing, Amardeep Singh Shergill Memorial college Mukandpur and Sikh National College Banga are the nearest colleges. and Lovely Professional University is 33 kilometres (21 mi) away from the village.

== Landmarks ==
The village has a Sikh shrine Singh Sabha Gurudwara where a religious fair held at the Gurdwara annually, which attended by people of all religions. Baba Jivan das Kutia, Baba Sobha Singh and Baba Saran Das Ji Palah Wale are religious sites. The village has co-operative bank and ATM facility.

== Transport ==
Banga railway station is the nearest train station however, Garhshankar Junction railway station is 20 kilometres (12 mi) away from the village. Sahnewal Airport is the nearest domestic airport which located 62 kilometres (39 mi) away in Ludhiana and the nearest international airport is located in Chandigarh also Sri Guru Ram Dass Jee International Airport is the second nearest airport which is 145 kilometres (90 mi) away in Amritsar.

== See also ==
- List of villages in India
