= Rehpa =

- Village
- Location in Punjab, India Rehpa (India)
- Coordinates: 31.1206643°N 75.9110068°E
- Country: India
- State: Punjab
- District: Shaheed Bhagat Singh Nagar

Government
  - Type: Panchayat raj
  - Body: Gram panchayat
- Elevation: 254 m (833 ft)

Population (2011)
  - Total: 1,378
- Sex ratio 703/675 ♂/♀

Languages
  - Official: Punjabi
- Time zone: UTC+5:30 (IST)
- PIN: 144507
- Telephone code: 01823
- ISO 3166 code: IN-PB
- Post office: Hakimpur (B.O)
- Website: nawanshahr.nic.in

Rehpa is a village in Shaheed Bhagat Singh Nagar district of Punjab State, India. It is located 1.8 kilometres (1.1 mi) away from branch post office Hakimpur, 27 kilometres (17 mi) from Nawanshahr, 21 kilometres (13 mi) from district headquarter Shaheed Bhagat Singh Nagar and 117 kilometres (73 mi) from state capital Chandigarh. The village is administrated by Sarpanch an elected representative of the village.

== Demography ==
As of 2011, Rehpa has a total number of 281 houses and population of 1378 of which 703 include are males while 675 are females according to the report published by Census India in 2011. The literacy rate of Rehpa is 82.27% higher than the state average of 75.84%. The population of children under the age of 6 years is 143 which is 10.38% of total population of Rehpa, and child sex ratio is approximately 810 as compared to Punjab state average of 846.

Most of the people are from Schedule Caste which constitutes 47.31% of total population in Rehpa. The town does not have any Schedule Tribe population so far.

The village has a mixture of Jatt, Tharkaan and schedule caste. The Jatt caste in the village has surnames Dhindsa, Poonia and Thind. The Tharkaan caste has the surname Dhanjal.

As per the report published by Census India in 2011, 461 people were engaged in work activities out of the total population of Rehpa which includes 383 males and 78 females. According to census survey report 2011, 65.73% workers describe their work as main work and 34.27% workers are involved in Marginal activity providing livelihood for less than 6 months.

== Education ==
The village has a Punjabi medium, co-ed primary school established in 1952. The school provide mid-day meal per Indian Midday Meal Scheme. As per Right of Children to Free and Compulsory Education Act the school provide free education to children between the ages of 6 and 14.

Amardeep Singh Shergill Memorial college Mukandpur, KC Engineering College and Doaba Khalsa Trust Group Of Institutions are the nearest colleges. Industrial Training Institute for women (ITI Nawanshahr) is 28 kilometres (17 mi). The village is 95 kilometres (59 mi) away from Chandigarh University, 75 kilometres (47 mi) from Indian Institute of Technology and 26 kilometres (16 mi) away from Lovely Professional University.

== Landmarks ==
The village has a Sikh shrine Gurudwara Raja Sahib Sri Nabh Kanwal which was named after Nabh Kawal Raja Sahib who was an Indian spiritual master, regarded by his devotees as a saint, fakir and satguru. A religious fair held here annually which attended by a large number of people of all religions.

== Transport ==
Banga train station is the nearest train station however, Phagwara Junction railway station is 19 kilometres (12 mi) away from the village. Sahnewal Airport is the nearest domestic airport which located 47 kilometres (29 mi) away in Ludhiana and the nearest international airport is located in Chandigarh also Sri Guru Ram Dass Jee International Airport is the second nearest airport which is 136 kilometres (85 mi) away in Amritsar.

== See also ==
- List of villages in India
