= Barnala Khurd =

- Village
- Location in Punjab, India Barnala Khurd (India)
- Coordinates: 31.0475155°N 76.0780263°E
- Country: India
- State: Punjab
- District: Shaheed Bhagat Singh Nagar

Government
  - Type: Panchayat raj
  - Body: Gram panchayat
- Elevation: 251 m (823 ft)

Population (2011)
  - Total: 339
- Sex ratio 187/152 ♂/♀

Languages
  - Official: Punjabi
- Time zone: UTC+5:30 (IST)
- PIN: 144517
- Telephone code: 01823
- ISO 3166 code: IN-PB
- Post office: Kahlon
- Website: nawanshahr.nic.in

Barnala Khurd is a village in Shaheed Bhagat Singh Nagar district of Punjab State, India. Kalan is Persian language word which means Big and Khurd is Persian word which means small when two villages have same name then it is distinguished as Kalan means Big and Khurd means Small with Village Name. It is situated on Ludhiana-Rahon road and located 4.1 kilometres (2.5 mi) away from Rahon, 20 kilometres (12 mi) from Banga, 12 kilometres (7.5 mi) from district headquarter Shaheed Bhagat Singh Nagar and 93 kilometres (58 mi) from state capital Chandigarh. The village is administrated by Sarpanch an elected representative of the village.

== Demography ==
As of 2011, Barnala Khurd has a total number of 58 houses and population of 339 of which 187 include are males while 152 are females according to the report published by Census India in 2011. The literacy rate of Barnala Khurd is 72.29%, higher than the state average of 75.84%. The population of children under the age of 6 years is 25 which is 7.37% of total population of Barnala Khurd, and child sex ratio is approximately 471 as compared to Punjab state average of 846.

Most of the people are from Schedule Caste which constitutes 17.99% of total population in Barnala Khurd. The town does not have any Schedule Tribe population so far.

As per the report published by Census India in 2011, 99 people were engaged in work activities out of the total population of Barnala Khurd which includes 89 males and 10 females. According to census survey report 2011, 85.86% workers describe their work as main work and 14.14% workers are involved in Marginal activity providing livelihood for less than 6 months.

== Education ==
Sikh National College Banga and Amardeep Singh Shergill Memorial college Mukandpur R.k.Arya college Nsr K.c College nsr Doaba Group of college Rahon are the nearest colleges. Lovely Professional University is 56 kilometres (35 mi) away from the village.

List of schools nearby Barnala Khurd:

- Government sen sec school, Rahon
- Government sec school, Nawanshahr
- Kirpal Sagar Academy, Bairsal
- Parkash model sen sec school, NSR
- K.C Public school, Nawanshahr
- Shivalik Public School, Nawanshahr
- Guru Nanak Public School, Sakopur
- Shiv Chand Public School, Sakopur
- Adarsh Bal Vidhalya, Aur

== Transport ==
Nawanshahr train station is the nearest train station however, Rahon station railway station is 3 kilometres (1.9 mi) away from the village. Sahnewal Airport is the nearest domestic airport which located 50 kilometres (31 mi) away in Ludhiana and the nearest international airport is located in Chandigarh also Sri Guru Ram Dass Jee International Airport is the second nearest airport which is 165 kilometres (103 mi) away in Amritsar.

== See also ==
- List of villages in India
