= Taharpur, SBS Nagar =

Taharpur
- Village
- Location in Punjab, India Taharpur (India)
- Coordinates: 31.1542035°N 75.8803319°E
- Country: India
- State: Punjab
- District: Shaheed Bhagat Singh Nagar

Government
  - Type: Panchayat raj
  - Body: Gram panchayat
- Elevation: 254 m (833 ft)

Population (2011)
  - Total: 859
- Sex ratio 446/413 ♂/♀

Languages
  - Official: Punjabi
- Time zone: UTC+5:30 (IST)
- PIN: 144502
- Telephone code: 01823
- ISO 3166 code: IN-PB
- Post office: Dosanjh Kalan
- Website: nawanshahr.nic.in

Taharpur is a village in Shaheed Bhagat Singh Nagar district of Punjab State, India. It is located 16 kilometres (9.9 mi) away from Banga, 30 kilometres (19 mi) from Nawanshahr, 28 kilometres (17 mi) from district headquarter Shaheed Bhagat Singh Nagar and 120 kilometres (75 mi) from state capital Chandigarh. The village is administrated by Sarpanch an elected representative of the village.

== Demography ==
As of 2011, Taharpur has a total number of 205 houses and population of 859 of which 446 include are males while 413 are females according to the report published by Census India in 2011. The literacy rate of Taharpur is 76.41% higher than the state average of 75.84%. The population of children under the age of 6 years is 62 which is 7.22% of total population of Taharpur, and child sex ratio is approximately 1067 as compared to Punjab state average of 846.

Most of the people are from Schedule Caste which constitutes 37.49% of total population in Taharpur. The town does not have any Schedule Tribe population so far.

As per the report published by Census India in 2011, 310 people were engaged in work activities out of the total population of Taharpur which includes 271 males and 39 females. According to census survey report 2011, 79.35% workers describe their work as main work and 20.65% workers are involved in Marginal activity providing livelihood for less than 6 months.

== Education ==
The village has a Punjabi medium, co-ed primary school established in 1966. The school provide mid-day meal per Indian Midday Meal Scheme. As per Right of Children to Free and Compulsory Education Act the school provide free education to children between the ages of 6 and 14.

Amardeep Singh Shergill Memorial college Mukandpur are the nearest colleges. Industrial Training Institute for women (ITI Nawanshahr) is 31 kilometres (19 mi). The village is 100 kilometres (62 mi) away from Chandigarh University, 78 kilometres (48 mi) from Indian Institute of Technology and 24 kilometres (15 mi) away from Lovely Professional University.Gpc behram polytechnic college away 9 km

== Transport ==
Banga train station is the nearest train station however, Phagwara Junction railway station is 17 kilometres (11 mi) away from the village. Sahnewal Airport is the nearest domestic airport which located 61 kilometres (38 mi) away in Ludhiana and the nearest international airport is located in Chandigarh also Sri Guru Ram Dass Jee International Airport is the second nearest airport which is 133 kilometres (83 mi) away in Amritsar.

== See also ==
- List of villages in India
