= Jasso Mazara =

- Village
- Location in Punjab, India Jasso Mazara (India)
- Coordinates: 31.2063045°N 75.8531928°E
- Country: India
- State: Punjab
- District: Shaheed Bhagat Singh Nagar

Government
  - Type: Panchayat raj
  - Body: Gram panchayat
- Elevation: 251 m (823 ft)

Population (2011)
  - Total: 1,536
- Sex ratio 777/759 ♂/♀

Languages
  - Official: Punjabi
- Time zone: UTC+5:30 (IST)
- PIN: 144501
- Telephone code: 01884
- ISO 3166 code: IN-PB
- Post office: Kultham
- Website: nawanshahr.nic.in

Jasso Mazara is a village in Shaheed Bhagat Singh Nagar district of Punjab State, India. It is located 2.1 kilometres (1.3 mi) away from postal head office Kultham, 13 kilometres (8.1 mi) from Banga, 27 kilometres (17 mi) from district headquarter Shaheed Bhagat Singh Nagar and 117 kilometres (73 mi) from state capital Chandigarh. The village is administrated by Sarpanch an elected representative of the village

== Demography ==
As of 2011, Jasso Mazara has a total number of 320 houses and population of 1536 of which 777 include are males while 759 are females according to the report published by Census India in 2011. The literacy rate of Jasso Mazara is 81.56%, higher than the state average of 75.84%. The population of children under the age of 6 years is 137 which is 8.92% of total population of Jasso Mazara, and child sex ratio is approximately 803 as compared to Punjab state average of 846.

Most of the people are from Schedule Caste which constitutes 55.34% of total population in Jasso Mazara. The town does not have any Schedule Tribe population so far. Ranu is the caste of Jatts living in this village. Ranu, like other Punjabi Jatts, have emigrated in large numbers to the UK, Canada, USA, Italy, Australia, and all over the world. Some families have their surname listed as Rana instead of Ranu on their passports.

As per the report published by Census India in 2011, 517 people were engaged in work activities out of the total population of Jasso Mazara which includes 462 males and 55 females. According to census survey report 2011, 83.17% workers describe their work as main work and 16.83% workers are involved in Marginal activity providing livelihood for less than 6 months.

== Education ==
The village has a Punjabi medium, co-ed upper primary with secondary school founded in 1935. The schools provide mid-day meal as per Indian Midday Meal Scheme and the meal prepared in school premises. As per Right of Children to Free and Compulsory Education Act the school provide free education to children between the ages of 6 and 14.

Amardeep Singh Shergill Memorial college Mukandpur and Sikh National College Banga are the nearest colleges. Lovely Professional University is 18.4 kilometres (11.4 mi) away from the village.

== Transport ==
Banga railway station is the nearest train station however, Phagwara Junction railway station is 10.3 kilometres (6.4 mi) away from the village. Sahnewal Airport is the nearest domestic airport which located 59.7 kilometres (37.1 mi) away in Ludhiana and the nearest international airport is located in Chandigarh also Sri Guru Ram Dass Jee International Airport is the second nearest airport which is 126 kilometres (78 mi) away in Amritsar.

== See also ==
- List of villages in India
