= Herian =

- Village
- Location in Punjab, India Herian (India)
- Coordinates: 31.1167738°N 75.9923117°E
- Country: India
- State: Punjab
- District: Shaheed Bhagat Singh Nagar

Government
  - Type: Panchayat raj
  - Body: Gram panchayat
- Elevation: 254 m (833 ft)

Population (2011)
  - Total: 922
- Sex ratio 511/481 ♂/♀

Languages
  - Official: Punjabi
- Time zone: UTC+5:30 (IST)
- PIN: 144511
- Telephone code: 01823
- ISO 3166 code: IN-PB
- Post office: Dosanjh Khurd
- Website: nawanshahr.nic.in

Herian is a village in Shaheed Bhagat Singh Nagar district of Punjab State, India. It is located 8 kilometres (5.0 mi) away from postal head office Dosanjh Khurd, 13 kilometres (8.1 mi) from Nawanshahr, 6 kilometres (3.7 mi) from district headquarter Shaheed Bhagat Singh Nagar and 102 kilometres (63 mi) from state capital Chandigarh. The village is administrated by Sarpanch an elected representative of the village.

== Demography ==
As of 2011, Herian has a total number of 212 houses and population of 992 of which 511 include are males while 481 are females according to the report published by Census India in 2011. The literacy rate of Herian is 84.17%, higher than the state average of 75.84%. The population of children under the age of 6 years is 76 which is 7.66% of total population of Herian, and child sex ratio is approximately 900 as compared to Punjab state average of 846.

Most of the people are from Schedule Caste which constitutes 44.66% of total population in Herian. The town does not have any Schedule Tribe population so far.

As per the report published by Census India in 2011, 298 people were engaged in work activities out of the total population of Herian which includes 298 males and 12 females. According to census survey report 2011, 99.33% workers describe their work as main work and 0.67% workers are involved in Marginal activity providing livelihood for less than 6 months.

== Education ==
The village has a Punjabi medium, girls only upper primary with secondary/higher secondary school founded in 1978. The school provide mid-day meal. The school provide free education to children between the ages of 6 and 14 as per Right of Children to Free and Compulsory Education Act.

Guru Nanak College of Nursing, Amardeep Singh Shergill Memorial college Mukandpur and Sikh National College Banga are the nearest colleges. and Lovely Professional University is 33 kilometres (21 mi) away from the village.

== Transport ==
Banga railway station is the nearest train station however, Garhshankar Junction railway station is 27 kilometres (17 mi) away from the village. Sahnewal Airport is the nearest domestic airport which located 56 kilometres (35 mi) away in Ludhiana and the nearest international airport is located in Chandigarh also Sri Guru Ram Dass Jee International Airport is the second nearest airport which is 149 kilometres (93 mi) away in Amritsar.

== See also ==
- List of villages in India
