= Kotli Khakhian =

- Village
- Location in Punjab, India Kotli Khakhian (India)
- Coordinates: 31.1833883°N 75.8202338°E
- Country: India
- State: Punjab
- District: Jalandhar
- Tehsil: Phillaur

Government
  - Type: Panchayat raj
  - Body: Gram panchayat
- Elevation: 246 m (807 ft)

Population (2011)
  - Total: 898
- Sex ratio 451/447 ♂/♀

Languages
  - Official: Punjabi
- Time zone: UTC+5:30 (IST)
- PIN: 144416
- Telephone code: 01826
- ISO 3166 code: IN-PB
- Vehicle registration: PB 37
- Post office: Apra
- Website: jalandhar.nic.in

Kotli Khakhian is a village in Phillaur tehsil of Jalandhar District of Punjab State, India. It is located 15 km from postal head office Apra, 8 km from Phagwara, 30.8 km from Jalandhar and 123 km from state capital Chandigarh. The village is administrated by a Sarpanch, an elected representative of the village.

== Demographics ==
As of 2011, the village has a population size of 898. It also comprises 259 Scheduled Caste members, constituting 28.8% of the total population.

== Education ==
The village has a co-ed primary school which was founded in 1961. It provides a mid-day meal as per the Indian Midday Meal Scheme.

== Transport ==
=== Rail ===
Phagwara Junction is the nearest train station, however, Goraya Railway Station is 11 km away from the village.

=== Air ===
The nearest domestic airport is located 57 km away in Ludhiana and the nearest international airport is located in Chandigarh. The second nearest international airport is 125 km away in Amritsar.
