= Gunachaur =

- Village
- Location in Punjab, India Gunachaur (India)
- Coordinates: 31.1443387°N 75.9783779°E
- Country: India
- State: Punjab
- District: Shaheed Bhagat Singh Nagar

Government
  - Type: Panchayat raj
  - Body: Gram panchayat
- Elevation: 254 m (833 ft)

Population (2011)
  - Total: 3,808
- Sex ratio 1986/1822 ♂/♀

Languages
  - Official: Punjabi
- Time zone: UTC+5:30 (IST)
- PIN: 144505
- Telephone code: 01823
- ISO 3166 code: IN-PB
- Post office: Banga
- Website: nawanshahr.nic.in

Gunachaur is a village in Shaheed Bhagat Singh Nagar district of Punjab State, India. It is located 5.3 kilometres (3.3 mi) away from postal head office Banga, 5.7 kilometres (3.5 mi) from Mukandpur, 9.3 kilometres (5.8 mi) from district headquarter Shaheed Bhagat Singh Nagar and 109 kilometres (68 mi) from state capital Chandigarh. The village is administrated by Sarpanch an elected representative of the village.

== Demography ==
As of 2011, Gunachaur has a total number of 784 houses and population of 3808 of which 1986 include are males while 1822 are females according to the report published by Census India in 2011. The literacy rate of Gunachaur is 78.86%, higher than the state average of 75.84%. The population of children under the age of 6 years is 383 which is 10.06% of total population of Gunachaur, and child sex ratio is approximately 877 as compared to Punjab state average of 846.

Most of the people are from Schedule Caste which constitutes 69.33% of total population in Gunachaur. The town does not have any Schedule Tribe population so far.

As per the report published by Census India in 2011, 1237 people were engaged in work activities out of the total population of Gunachaur which includes 1096 males and 141 females. According to census survey report 2011, 86.50% workers describe their work as main work and 13.50% workers are involved in Marginal activity providing livelihood for less than 6 months.

== Education ==
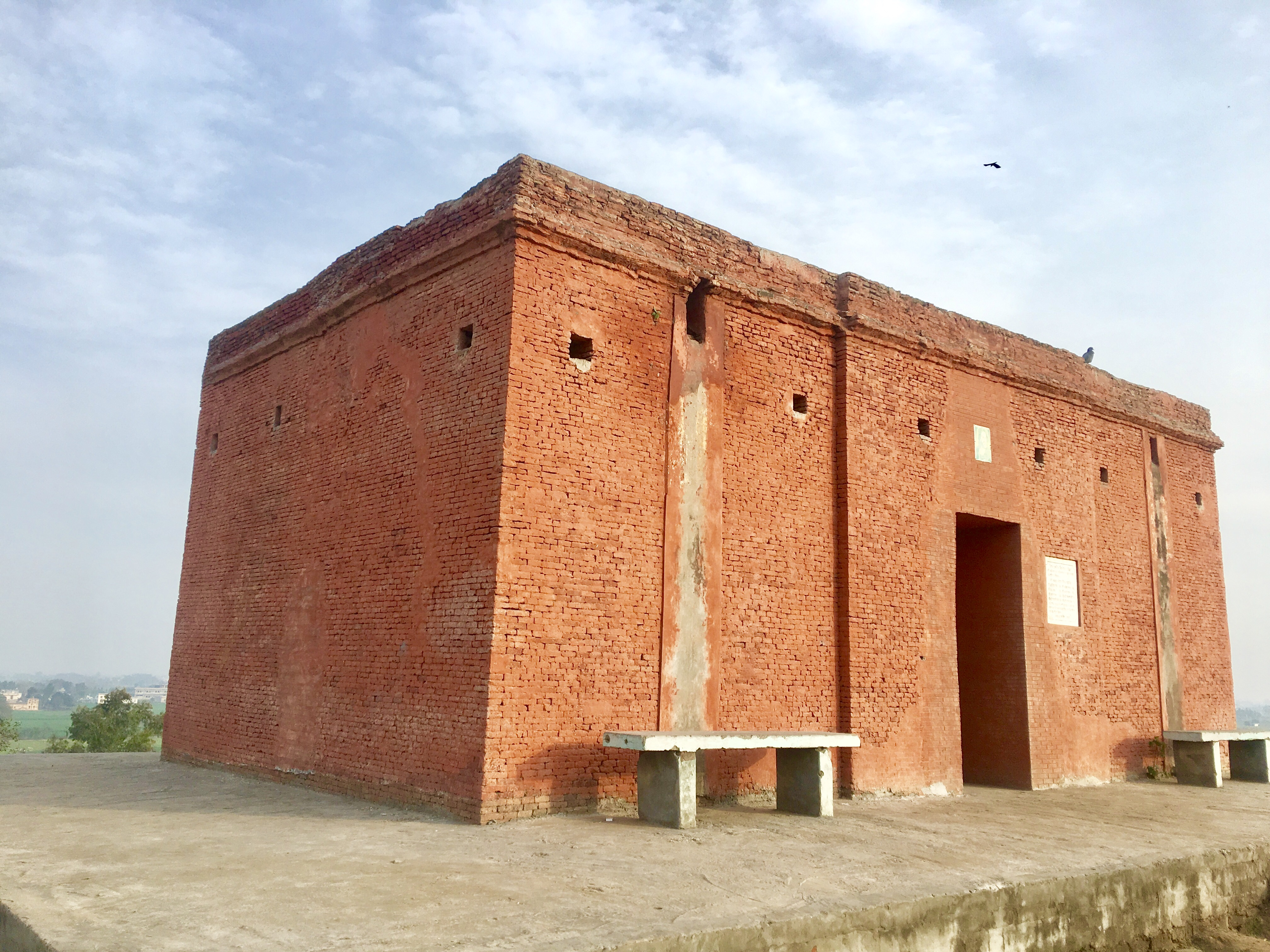
A historical monument in Gunachaur

Amardeep Singh Shergill Memorial college Mukandpur and Sikh National College Banga are the nearest colleges. Lovely Professional University is 35 kilometres (22 mi) away from the village.

== Transport ==
Banga railway station is the nearest train station however, Garhshankar Junction railway station is 22 kilometres (14 mi) away from the village. Sahnewal Airport is the nearest domestic airport which located 55 kilometres (34 mi) away in Ludhiana and the nearest international airport is located in Chandigarh also Sri Guru Ram Dass Jee International Airport is the second nearest airport which is 144 kilometres (89 mi) away in Amritsar.

== See also ==
- List of villages in India
