= Gujjarpur Kalan =

- Village
- Location in Punjab, India Gujjarpur Kalan (India)
- Coordinates: 31.1461408°N 76.1021982°E
- Country: India
- State: Punjab
- District: Shaheed Bhagat Singh Nagar

Government
  - Type: Panchayat raj
  - Body: Gram panchayat
- Elevation: 355 m (1,165 ft)

Population (2011)
  - Total: 840
- Sex ratio 416/424 ♂/♀

Languages
  - Official: Punjabi
- Time zone: UTC+5:30 (IST)
- PIN: 144514
- Telephone code: 01823
- ISO 3166 code: IN-PB
- Post office: Mahalon
- Website: nawanshahr.nic.in

Gujjarpur Kalan is a village in Shaheed Bhagat Singh Nagar district of Punjab State, India. It is located 12 kilometres (7.5 mi) away from Banga, 3.8 kilometres (2.4 mi) from Nawanshahr, 3 kilometres (1.9 mi) from district headquarter Shaheed Bhagat Singh Nagar and 90 kilometres (56 mi) from state capital Chandigarh. The village is administrated by Sarpanch an elected representative of the village.

== Demography ==
As of 2011, Gujjarpur Kalan has a total number of 176 houses and population of 840 of which 416 include are males while 424 are females according to the report published by Census India in 2011. The literacy rate of Gujjarpur Kalan is 74.29%, lower than the state average of 75.84%. The population of children under the age of 6 years is 101 which is 12.02% of total population of Gujjarpur Kalan, and child sex ratio is approximately 906 as compared to Punjab state average of 846.

Most of the people are from Schedule Caste which constitutes 77.26% of total population in Gujjarpur Kalan. The town does not have any Schedule Tribe population so far.

As per the report published by Census India in 2011, 248 people were engaged in work activities out of the total population of Gujjarpur Kalan which includes 228 males and 20 females. According to census survey report 2011, 98.39% workers describe their work as main work and 1.61% workers are involved in Marginal activity providing livelihood for less than 6 months.

== Education ==
The village has a Punjabi medium, co-ed primary school founded in 1953. The schools does not provide mid-day meal. The school provide free education to children between the ages of 6 and 14 as per Right of Children to Free and Compulsory Education Act. KC Engineering College and Doaba Khalsa Trust Group Of Institutions are the nearest colleges. Industrial Training Institute for women (ITI Nawanshahr) is 4.3 kilometres (2.7 mi) and Lovely Professional University is 43 kilometres (27 mi) away from the village.

== Transport ==
Nawanshahr railway station is the nearest train station however, Garhshankar Junction railway station is 11 kilometres (6.8 mi) away from the village. Sahnewal Airport is the nearest domestic airport which located 59 kilometres (37 mi) away in Ludhiana and the nearest international airport is located in Chandigarh also Sri Guru Ram Dass Jee International Airport is the second nearest airport which is 152 kilometres (94 mi) away in Amritsar. There are two male and one female doctor from Gujjar Pur Kalan. One doctor named Satvir(Babbu) is practicing as Interventional Radiology doctor in Canada.
