= Balowal =

- Village
- Location in Punjab, India Balowal (India)
- Coordinates: 31.1314849°N 75.9025727°E
- Country: India
- State: Punjab
- District: Shaheed Bhagat Singh Nagar

Government
  - Type: Panchayat raj
  - Body: Gram panchayat
- Elevation: 251 m (823 ft)

Population (2011)
  - Total: 1,036
- Sex ratio 523/513 ♂/♀

Languages
  - Official: Punjabi
- Time zone: UTC+5:30 (IST)
- PIN: 144507
- Telephone code: 01823
- ISO 3166 code: IN-PB
- Post office: Mukandpur
- Website: nawanshahr.nic.in

Balowal is a village in Shaheed Bhagat Singh Nagar district of Punjab State, India. It is situated on Phagwara-Mukandpur road and located 4.6 kilometres (2.9 mi) away from postal head office Mukandpur, 13 kilometres (8.1 mi) from Banga, 27 kilometres (17 mi) from district headquarter Shaheed Bhagat Singh Nagar and 117 kilometres (73 mi) from state capital Chandigarh. The village is administrated by Sarpanch an elected representative of the village.

== Demography ==
As of 2011, Balowal has a total number of 208 houses and population of 1036 of which 523 include are males while 513 are females according to the report published by Census India in 2011. The literacy rate of Balowal is 80.42%, higher than the state average of 75.84%. The population of children under the age of 6 years is 91 which is 8.78% of total population of Balowal, and child sex ratio is approximately 655 as compared to Punjab state average of 846.

Most of the people are from Schedule Caste which constitutes 23.94% of total population in Balowal. The town does not have any Schedule Tribe population so far.

As per the report published by Census India in 2011, 371 people were engaged in work activities out of the total population of Balowal which includes 285 males and 86 females. According to census survey report 2011, 73.85% workers describe their work as main work and 26.15% workers are involved in Marginal activity providing livelihood for less than 6 months.

== Education ==
The village has a Punjabi medium, co-ed primary school founded in 1976 and an upper primary school founded in 1974. The schools provide mid-day meal as per Indian Midday Meal Scheme. As per Right of Children to Free and Compulsory Education Act the school provide free education to children between the ages of 6 and 14.

Sikh National College Banga and Amardeep Singh Shergill Memorial college Mukandpur are the nearest colleges. Lovely Professional University is 26 kilometres (16 mi) away from the village.

== History and landmarks ==
The village is known as the birthplace of Nabh Kawal Raja Sahib who was an Indian spiritual master, regarded by his devotees as a saint, fakir and satguru born here in 1862. The village has two gurdwaras named after him one of them is situated inside the village at the place where he was born which named Janam Asthaan Nanke Ghar Raja Sahib (Birthplace of Raja Sahib) and Gurudwara Nabh Kawal Raja Sahib is situated just opposite the entrance of the village on Phagwara-Mukandpur road. A religious fair held here annually which attended by a large number of people of all religions.

== Transport ==
Banga train station is the nearest train station. Phagwara Junction railway station is 17 kilometres (11 mi) away from the village. Sahnewal Airport is the nearest domestic airport which is located 49 kilometres (30 mi) away in Ludhiana, and the nearest international airport is located in Chandigarh also Sri Guru Ram Dass Jee International Airport is the second nearest airport which is 134 kilometres (83 mi) away in Amritsar.

== See also ==
- List of villages in India
