= Kaleran =

- Village
- Location in Punjab, India Kaleran (India)
- Coordinates: 31.204531°N 75.952603°E
- Country: India
- State: Punjab
- District: nawanshahar
- Elevation: 237 m (778 ft)

Languages
  - Official: Punjabi
- Time zone: UTC+5:30 (IST)
- PIN: 144505
- Telephone code: 01823
- Sex ratio: 52:48 ♂/♀

Kaleran is a village in Shahid Bhagat Singh Nagar district, Punjab, India. The village is situated near Banga and located at approximately 325 km from New Delhi, 120 km from Amritsar and 1400 km from Mumbai. It is in the North-West part of India; a few hundred kilometres south of Kashmir and to the west of the Himalayan foothills of Punjab and Himachal Pradesh. The village is situated approximately 1.8 km from Dhahan.The village has lots of peacock and snakes.
