= Gosal, SBS Nagar =

Gosal
- Village
- Location in Punjab, India Gosal (India)
- Coordinates: 31.1695909°N 75.9751824°E
- Country: India
- State: Punjab
- District: Shaheed Bhagat Singh Nagar

Government
  - Type: Panchayat raj
  - Body: Gram panchayat
- Elevation: 251 m (823 ft)

Population (2011)
  - Total: 904
- Sex ratio 462/442 ♂/♀

Languages
  - Official: Punjabi
- Time zone: UTC+5:30 (IST)
- PIN: 144505
- Telephone code: 01823
- ISO 3166 code: IN-PB
- Post office: Banga
- Website: nawanshahr.nic.in

Gosal is a village in Shaheed Bhagat Singh Nagar district of Punjab State, India. It is located 3.5 kilometres (2.2 mi) away from postal head office Banga, 15 kilometres (9.3 mi) from Nawanshahr, 13 kilometres (8.1 mi) from district headquarter Shaheed Bhagat Singh Nagar and 108 kilometres (67 mi) from state capital Chandigarh. The village is administrated by Sarpanch an elected representative of the village.

== Demography ==
As of 2011, Gosal has a total number of 196 houses and population of 904 of which 462 include are males while 442 are females according to the report published by Census India in 2011. The literacy rate of Gosal is 77.21%, higher than the state average of 75.84%. The population of children under the age of 6 years is 88 which is 9.73% of total population of Gosal, and child sex ratio is approximately 1047 as compared to Punjab state average of 846.

Most of the people are from Schedule Caste which constitutes 63.16% of total population in Gosal. The town does not have any Schedule Tribe population so far.

As per the report published by Census India in 2011, 276 people were engaged in work activities out of the total population of Gosal which includes 249 males and 27 females. According to census survey report 2011, 95.65% workers describe their work as main work and 4.35% workers are involved in Marginal activity providing livelihood for less than 6 months.

== Education ==
The village has a Punjabi medium, co-ed primary school. The schools does not provide mid-day meal. The school provide free education to children between the ages of 6 and 14 as per Right of Children to Free and Compulsory Education Act. Amardeep Singh Shergill Memorial college Mukandpur and Sikh National College Banga are the nearest colleges. Lovely Professional University is 33.8 kilometres (21.0 mi) away from the village.

== Transport ==
Banga railway station is the nearest train station however, Phagwara Junction railway station is 23 kilometres (14 mi) away from the village. Sahnewal Airport is the nearest domestic airport which located 57 kilometres (35 mi) away in Ludhiana and the nearest international airport is located in Chandigarh also Sri Guru Ram Dass Jee International Airport is the second nearest airport which is 140 kilometres (87 mi) away in Amritsar.

== See also ==
- List of villages in India
