= Nagra, SBS Nagar =

Nagra
- Village
- Location in Punjab, India Nagra (India)
- Coordinates: 31.1536374°N 76.0013782°E
- Country: India
- State: Punjab
- District: Shaheed Bhagat Singh Nagar

Government
  - Type: Panchayat raj
  - Body: Gram panchayat
- Elevation: 251 m (823 ft)

Population (2011)
  - Total: 626
- Sex ratio 286/340 ♂/♀

Languages
  - Official: Punjabi
- Time zone: UTC+5:30 (IST)
- PIN: 144511
- Telephone code: 01884
- ISO 3166 code: IN-PB
- Post office: Dosanjh Khurd
- Website: nawanshahr.nic.in

Nagra is a village in Shaheed Bhagat Singh Nagar district of Punjab State, India. It is located 1.8 kilometres (1.1 mi) away from post office Dosanjh Khurd, 12 kilometres (7.5 mi) from Nawanshahr, 8.5 kilometres (5.3 mi) from district headquarter Shaheed Bhagat Singh Nagar and 103 kilometres (64 mi) from state capital Chandigarh. The village is administrated by Sarpanch an elected representative of the village.

== Demography ==
As of 2011, Nagra has a total number of 139 houses and population of 626 of which 686 include are males while 340 are females according to the report published by Census India in 2011. The literacy rate of Nagra is 87.68% higher than the state average of 75.84%. The population of children under the age of 6 years is 58 which is 9.27% of total population of Nagra, and child sex ratio is approximately 1071 as compared to Punjab state average of 846.

Most of the people are from Schedule Caste which constitutes 51.28% of total population in Nagra. The town does not have any Schedule Tribe population so far.

As per the report published by Census India in 2011, 213 people were engaged in work activities out of the total population of Nagra which includes 152 males and 61 females. According to census survey report 2011, 79.34% workers describe their work as main work and 20.66% workers are involved in Marginal activity providing livelihood for less than 6 months.

== Education ==
The village has a Punjabi medium, co-ed primary school established in 1976. The school provide mid-day meal as per Indian Midday Meal Scheme. As per Right of Children to Free and Compulsory Education Act the school provide free education to children between the ages of 6 and 14.

KC Engineering College and Doaba Khalsa Trust Group Of Institutions are the nearest colleges. Industrial Training Institute for women (ITI Nawanshahr) is 17 kilometres (11 mi). The village is 84 kilometres (52 mi) away from Chandigarh University, 61 kilometres (38 mi) from Indian Institute of Technology and 35 kilometres (22 mi) away from Lovely Professional University.

List of schools nearby:

- Dashmesh Model School, Kahma
- Govt Primary School, Kahlon
- Govt High School, Garcha

== Transport ==
Banga train station is the nearest train station approx 4 km, Garhshankar Junction railway station is 19 kilometres (12 mi) away from the village. Sahnewal Airport is the nearest domestic airport which located 60 kilometres (37 mi) away in Ludhiana and the nearest international airport is located in Chandigarh also Sri Guru Ram Dass Jee International Airport is the second nearest airport which is 144 kilometres (89 mi) away in Amritsar.

== See also ==
- List of villages in India
