= Ladhar Khurd =

- Village
- Location in Punjab, India Ladhar Khurd (India)
- Coordinates: 31.1441803°N 75.8885191°E
- Country: India
- State: Punjab
- District: Jalandhar

Government
  - Type: Panchayat raj
  - Body: Gram panchayat
- Elevation: 240 m (790 ft)

Population (2011)
  - Total: 559
- Sex ratio 269/290 ♂/♀

Languages
  - Official: Punjabi
- Time zone: UTC+5:30 (IST)
- PIN: 144502
- ISO 3166 code: IN-PB
- Vehicle registration: PB- 08
- Website: jalandhar.nic.in

Ladhar Khurd is a village in Jalandhar district of Punjab State, India. It is located 6.5 km away from Mukandpur, 22 km from Phillaur, 39 km from district headquarter Jalandhar and 117 km from state capital This village settled by Jat community Mahan Singh Ladhar and mostly people all religious use as last name Ladhar Chandigarh. The village is administrated by a sarpanch who is an elected representative of village as per Panchayati raj (India).

== Demography ==
According to the report published by Census India in 2011, Ladhar Khurd has a total number of 126 houses and population of 559 of which include 269 males and 290 females. Literacy rate of Ladhar Khurd is 77.04%, higher than state average of 75.84%. The population of children under the age of 6 years is 45 which is 8.05% of total population of Ladhar Khurd, and child sex ratio is approximately 1500 higher than state average of 846.

Most of the people are from Schedule Caste which constitutes 37.21% of total population in Ladhar Khurd. The town does not have any Schedule Tribe population so far. As per census 2011, 218 people were engaged in work activities out of the total population of Ladhar Khurd which includes 161 males and 57 females. According to census survey report 2011, 98.62% workers describe their work as main work and 1.38% workers are involved in marginal activity providing livelihood for less than 6 months.

== Transport ==
Goraya railway station is the nearest train station; however, Phagwara Junction train station is 17 km away from the village. The village is 53 km away from domestic airport in Ludhiana and the nearest international airport is located in Chandigarh also Sri Guru Ram Dass Jee International Airport is the second nearest airport which is 133 km away in Amritsar.
