= Bharo Mazara =

- Village
- Location in Punjab, India Bharo Mazara (India)
- Coordinates: 31.1606402°N 75.9930345°E
- Country: India
- State: Punjab
- District: Shaheed Bhagat Singh Nagar

Government
  - Type: Panchayat raj
  - Body: Gram panchayat
- Elevation: 254 m (833 ft)

Population (2011)
  - Total: 1,662
- Sex ratio 881/781 ♂/♀

Languages
  - Official: Punjabi
- Time zone: UTC+5:30 (IST)
- PIN: 144504
- Telephone code: 01823
- ISO 3166 code: IN-PB
- Post office: Behram
- Website: nawanshahr.nic.in

Bharo Mazara is a village in Shaheed Bhagat Singh Nagar district of Punjab State, India. It is located 13 kilometres (8.1 mi) away from postal head office Behram, 3 kilometres (1.9 mi) from Banga, 13.6 kilometres (8.5 mi) from district headquarter Shaheed Bhagat Singh Nagar and 107 kilometres (66 mi) from state capital Chandigarh. The village is administrated by Sarpanch an elected representative of the village.

== Demography ==
As of 2011, Bharo Mazara has a total number of 353 houses and population of 1662, of which 881 include are males while 781 are females according to the report published by Census India in 2011. The literacy rate of Bharo Mazara is 80.44%, higher than the state average of 75.84%. The population of children under the age of 6 years is 164 which is 9.87% of total population of Bharo Mazara, and child sex ratio is approximately 1216 as compared to Punjab state average of 846.

Most of the people are from Schedule Caste which constitutes 72.74% of total population in Bharo Mazara. The town does not have any Schedule Tribe population so far.

As per the report published by Census India in 2011, 641 people were engaged in work activities out of the total population of Bharo Mazara which includes 482 males and 159 females. According to census survey report 2011, 77.22% workers describe their work as main work and 22.78% workers are involved in Marginal activity providing livelihood for less than 6 months.

== Education ==
The village has a Punjabi medium, co-ed upper primary school founded on 2001. The school provide mid-day meal as per Indian Midday Meal Scheme. The school provide free education to children between the ages of 6 and 14 as per Right of Children to Free and Compulsory Education Act.

Amardeep Singh Shergill Memorial college Mukandpur and Sikh National College Banga are the nearest colleges. Lovely Professional University is 34 kilometres (21 mi) away from the village.

== Transport ==
Banga railway station is the nearest train station however, Nawanshahr railway station is 17 kilometres (11 mi) away from the village. Sahnewal Airport is the nearest domestic airport which located 58 kilometres (36 mi) away in Ludhiana and the nearest international airport is located in Chandigarh also Sri Guru Ram Dass Jee International Airport is the second nearest airport which is 142 kilometres (88 mi) away in Amritsar.

== See also ==
- List of villages in India
