= Katt (disambiguation) =

Katt may refer to:

== People ==
Given name or nickname

- Big Katt (born 1977), American football player
- Katt Shea (born 1955), American actress
- Katt Williams (born 1971), American rapper and actor

Surname

- George Katt (born 1975), American actor
- Geraldine Katt (1920–1995), Austrian actress
- Latika Katt (1948–2025), Indian sculptor
- Nicky Katt (1970–2025), American actor
- Ray Katt (1927–1999), American baseball player and coach
- Stephan Katt (born 1979), German racing driver
- William Katt (born 1951), American actor
- William Herman Katt (1915–1992), American actor

== Other uses ==
- Katt (Breath of Fire), a character in the video game Breath of Fire II
- Katt, a village in Shaheed Bhagat Singh Nagar district of Punjab State, India
- KATT-FM, a radio station in Oklahoma City
