= Dhahan =

- Village
- Location in Punjab, India Dhahan (India)
- Coordinates: 31.1942551°N 75.9390502°E
- Country: India
- State: Punjab
- District: Shaheed Bhagat Singh Nagar

Government
  - Type: Panchayat raj
  - Body: Gram panchayat
- Elevation: 355 m (1,165 ft)

Population (2011)
  - Total: 1,309
- Sex ratio 646/666 ♂/♀

Languages
  - Official: Punjabi
- Time zone: UTC+5:30 (IST)
- PIN: 144505
- Telephone code: 01884
- ISO 3166 code: IN-PB
- Post office: Banga
- Website: nawanshahr.nic.in

Dhahan is a village in Shaheed Bhagat Singh Nagar district of Punjab State, India. It is located 5.4 kilometres (3.4 mi) away from postal head office Banga, 11 kilometres (6.8 mi) from Nawanshahr, 13 kilometres (8.1 mi) from district headquarter Shaheed Bhagat Singh Nagar and 89 kilometres (55 mi) from state capital Chandigarh. The village is administrated by Sarpanch an elected representative of the village.

== Demography ==
As of 2011, Dhahan has a total number of 287 houses and population of 1309 of which 643 include are males while 666 are females according to the report published by Census India in 2011. The literacy rate of Dhahan is 81.38%, higher than the state average of 75.84%. The population of children under the age of 6 years is 138 which is 10.54% of total population of Dhahan, and child sex ratio is approximately 816 as compared to Punjab state average of 846.

Most of the people are from Schedule Caste which constitutes 46.44% of total population in Dhahan. The town does not have any Schedule Tribe population so far.

As per the report published by Census India in 2011, 400 people were engaged in work activities out of the total population of Dhahan which includes 349 males and 51 females. According to census survey report 2011, 98.25% workers describe their work as main work and 1.75% workers are involved in Marginal activity providing livelihood for less than 6 months.

== Education ==
The village has a private un-aided Punjabi medium, co-ed primary with upper primary and secondary/higher secondary school founded in 1987. The school does not provide mid-day meal.

Guru Nanak College of Nursing is nearby Guru Nanak Mission Public Senior Secondary School Dhahan. Amardeep Singh Shergill Memorial college Mukandpur and Sikh National College Banga are the nearest colleges. and Lovely Professional University is 26 kilometres (16 mi) away from the village.

== Transport ==
Mallu Pota railway station is the nearest train station however, Phagwara Junction railway station is 18 kilometres (11 mi) away from the village. Sahnewal Airport is the nearest domestic airport which located 67 kilometres (42 mi) away in Ludhiana and the nearest international airport is located in Chandigarh also Sri Guru Ram Dass Jee International Airport is the second nearest airport which is 134 kilometres (83 mi) away in Amritsar.

== See also ==
- List of villages in India
