= Sotran =

- Village
- Location in Punjab, India Sotran (India)
- Coordinates: 31.1778718°N 75.9825771°E
- Country: India
- State: Punjab
- District: Shaheed Bhagat Singh Nagar

Government
  - Type: Panchayat raj
  - Body: Gram panchayat
- Elevation: 251 m (823 ft)

Population (2011)
  - Total: 858
- Sex ratio 440/418 ♂/♀

Languages
  - Official: Punjabi
- Time zone: UTC+5:30 (IST)
- PIN: 144505
- Telephone code: 01884
- ISO 3166 code: IN-PB
- Post office: Banga
- Website: nawanshahr.nic.in

Sotran is a village in Shaheed Bhagat Singh Nagar district of Punjab State, India. It is located 9.2 kilometres (5.7 mi) away Mukandpur, 1.8 kilometres (1.1 mi) from Banga, 12 kilometres (7.5 mi) from district headquarters Shaheed Bhagat Singh Nagar and 105 kilometres (65 mi) from the state capital Chandigarh. The village is administrated by Sarpanch an elected representative of the village.

== Demography ==
As of 2011, Sotran has 184 houses and a population of 858 of which 440 are males and 418 females, according to the report published by Census India in 2011. The literacy rate of Sotran is 77.74%, higher than the state average of 75.84%. The population of children under the age of 6 years is 72 which is 8.39% of the total population of Sotran, and child sex ratio is approximately 714 as compared to Punjab state average of 846.

Most of the people are from Schedule Caste which constitutes 65.03% of the total population in Sotran. The town does not have any Schedule Tribe population so far.

As per the report published by Census India in 2011, 280 people were engaged in work activities out of the total population of Sotran which includes 240 males and 40 females. According to the census survey report 2011, 95.71% of workers describe their work as main work and 4.29% of workers are involved in marginal activity providing livelihood for less than 6 months.

== Education ==
The village has a Punjabi medium, co-ed upper primary school founded in 1996. The schools provide midday meal as per Indian Midday Meal Scheme and the meal prepared in school premises. As per Right of Children to Free and Compulsory Education Act, the school provides free education to children between the ages of 6 and 14. Amardeep Singh Shergill Memorial College Mukandpur and Sikh National College Banga are the nearest colleges.

== Landmarks ==
The village has a historical Sikh temple Gurudwara Sri Gurplaha Sahib which dedicated to Guru Hargobind who stayed here after his last battle on his way from Kartarpur to Kiratpur in 1635. A religious fair held at the Gurdwara annually in the month of July which attracts a large number of devotees.

== Transport ==
Banga train station is the nearest train station, however, Phagwara Junction railway station is 23 kilometres (14 mi) away from the village. Sahnewal Airport is the nearest domestic airport which is located 59 kilometres (37 mi) away in Ludhiana and the nearest international airport is located in Chandigarh also Sri Guru Ram Dass Jee International Airport is the second nearest airport which is 140 kilometres (87 mi) away in Amritsar.

== See also ==
- List of villages in India
