= Apra, Punjab =

Apra
- Census Town
- Location in Punjab, India Apra (India)
- Coordinates: 31.086072°N 75.875444°E
- Country: India
- State: Punjab
- District: Jalandhar
- Tehsil: Phillaur
- Elevation: 246 m (807 ft)

Population (2011)
  - Total: 6,258
- Sex ratio 3219/3039 ♂/♀

Languages
  - Official: Punjabi
  - Other spoken: Hindi
- Time zone: UTC+5:30 (IST)
- PIN: 144416
- Telephone code: 01826
- ISO 3166 code: IN-PB
- Vehicle registration: PB 37
- Website: jalandhar.nic.in

Apra, also known as The Golden City Apra, is a census town in Phillaur Tehsil in Jalandhar district of Punjab State, India. The town is known for gold jewelry and paddy crops which are produced in large amounts. It is located 46 kilometres (29 mi) towards East from Jalandhar, 12 kilometres (7.5 mi) from Phillaur and 110 kilometres (68 mi) from Chandigarh. Apra is the largest town as compared to other surrounding villages and has the main marketplace. The town is administrated by Sarpanch an elected representative of the village.

The nearest train station is situated 12 kilometres (7.5 mi) away in Phillaur, nearest domestic airport is at Ludhiana and the nearest international airport is 142.5 kilometres (88.5 mi) away in Amritsar.

== Geography ==
The town is located 12 kilometres (7.5 mi) far from Phillaur and situated on the main road which connects Phillaur to Banga. The town is famous for gold jewellery and imported goods.

== Landmarks ==
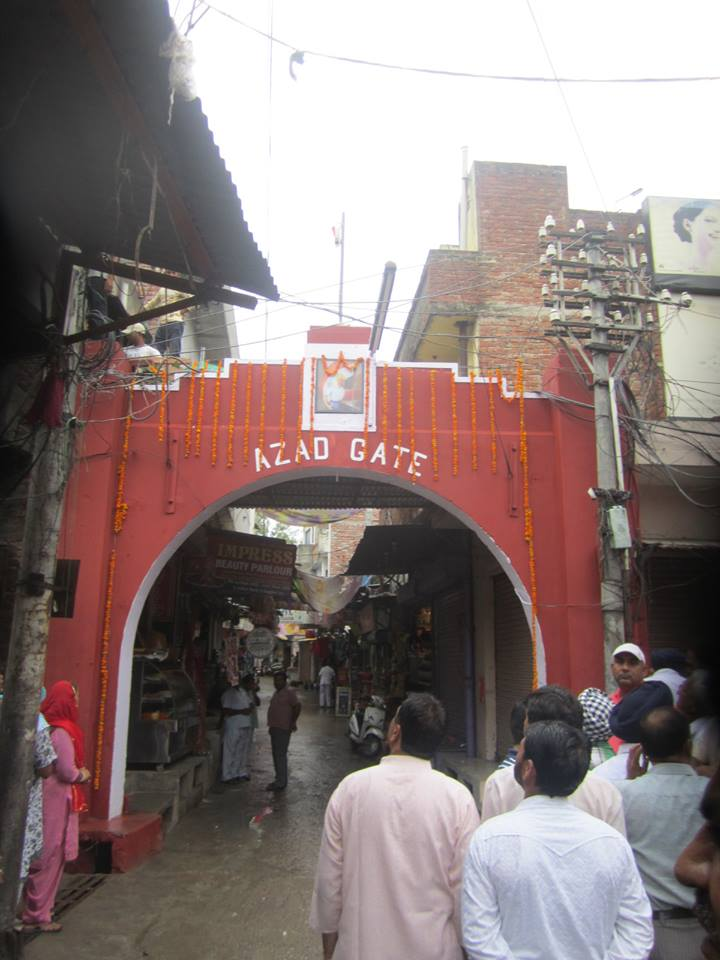
A picture of Azad Gate Apra

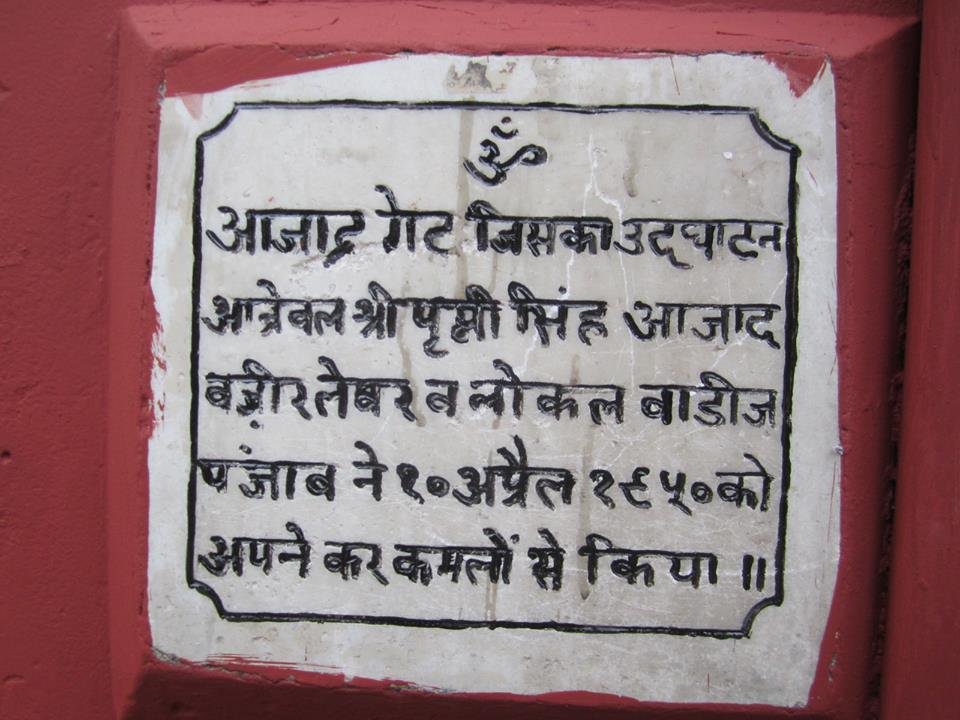
The note about Azad Gate

Azad Gate is an important historical building which was built in 1950. Ram Mandir, Shiv Mandir, Hanuman Mandir, and Bhai Mehar-Chand Ji Temple are Hindu temples. Sachidanand Ji Ashram, Peer Baba Ji, Darbar Baba Sheikh Nasira Ji (Khangah) and Gurudwara Shri Kalgidhar Sahib are religious sites.

Apra has nine banks, including Kotak Mahindra Bank, the Punjab National Bank, the State Bank of India. It also has the branch a co-operative bank, called Jalandhar central co-operative bank.

== Festival and fairs ==
There are a number of festivals and fairs people celebrate in Apra which has taken a semi-secular meaning and are regarded as cultural festivals by people of all religions.

The following is a list of festivals and fairs celebrated annually:

- Pandit Gowardhan Das Sangeet Sammelan in warm memories of Pandit Gowardhan Das and Pandit Satpal Kalia ji
- Dussehra
- Sharad Mela Bhai Mehar Chand Ji
- Maharishi Valmiki Ji Jayanti
- Shri Guru Nanak Gurpurab
- Shri Guru Ram Das Jayanti (Gurmat Samagam)
- Bhagwati Jagran
- Shri Guru Ravidass Jayanti

== Demography ==
Religion in Apra, Punjab (2011)
1. Hinduism (76.8%)
2. Sikhism (18.7%)
3. Islam (3.93%)
4. Christianity (0.34%)
5. Other or not religious (0.22%)

Apra is a census town in Jalandhar district, Punjab. As of 2011, Apra had a population of 6,258 of which 3,219 (51.4%) are males and 3,039 (48.6%) are females according to the report published by Census India in 2011. Literacy rate of Apra is 82.86%, higher than state average of 75.84%. The population of children under the age of 6 years is 664 which is 10.61% of total population of Apra, and female sex ratio is 944 compared to the state average of 895. Child sex ratio is approximately 824 as compared to Punjab state average of 846.

The majority of the residents in the town follow Hinduism which is 76.77% (4804) against the total population of Apra and the second largest majority is Sikhism which is 18.68% (1,044).

== Caste ==
Most of the people are from Schedule Caste (SC) which constitutes 42.28% of total population in Apra. The town does not have any Schedule Tribe (ST) population so far.

== Work profile ==
2,083 people were engaged in work or business activity out of the total population of Apra which includes 1,801 males and 282 females. According to census survey report 2011, workers defined as person who does job, service, business and cultivator and labour activity. Of the 2,083 in the working population, 93.76% workers were occupied in main work while 6.24% of total workers were occupied in marginal work.

== Education ==
=== School ===
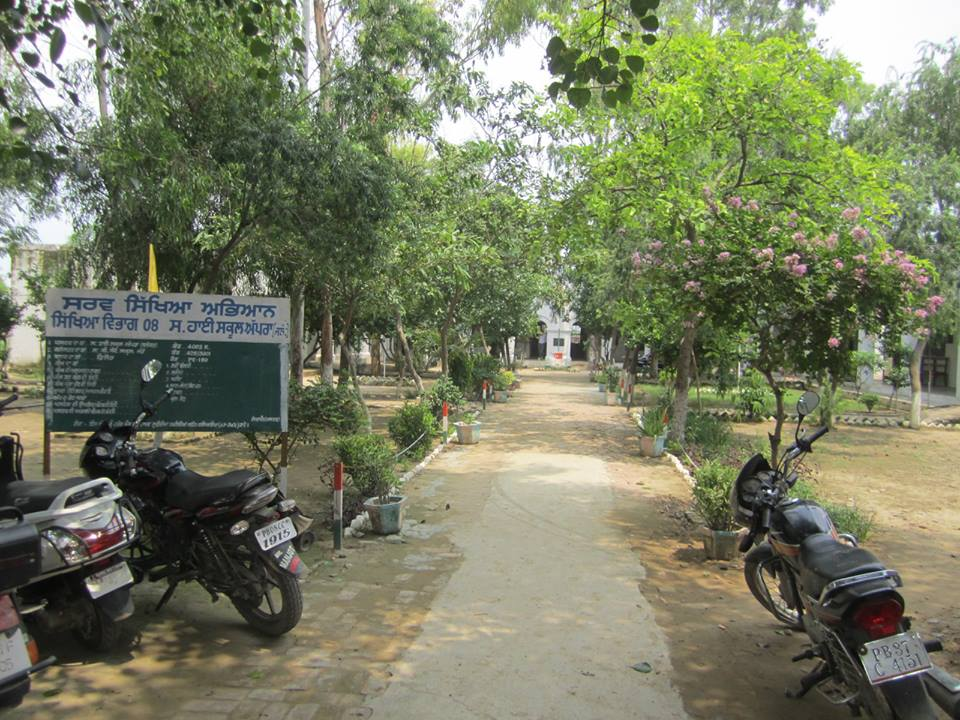
The main entrance of Govt. High School Apra.

The town has a Punjabi medium, co-ed upper primary with secondary school established in 1886 and a primary with upper primary and secondary/higher secondary school established in 1932. The schools provide mid-day meal prepared on the school premises as per Indian Midday Meal Scheme and also provide free education to children between the ages of 6 and 14 as per Right of Children to Free and Compulsory Education Act. The town also has a private aided Punjabi medium, primary with upper primary and secondary/higher secondary school (MG Arya Kanya Pathshala Senior Secondary School). The school was established in 1954.

=== College ===
- DRV DAV Centenary College, Phillaur (12.5 kilometres (7.8 mi))
- Amardeep Singh Shergill Memorial College, Mukandpur (8.7 kilometres (5.4 mi))
- Sikh National College, Banga (18.2 kilometres (11.3 mi))

=== University ===
- Lovely Professional University, Phagwara (32.7 kilometres (20.3 mi))
- Punjab Agricultural University, Ludhiana (30.6 kilometres (19.0 mi))
- Punjab University, Chandigarh (115 kilometres (71 mi))
- GNA University, Phagwara (30 kilometres (19 mi))

== Climate ==
Apra

Climate chart (precipitation, max. and min. temperature)
J	F	M	A	M	J	J	A	S	O	N	D
20 19 7	38 21 9	30 26 13	20 35 19	20 39 23	61 40 26	229 35 26	118 33 25	86 33 23	5 32 18	13 26 12	20 21 7
- █ Average max. and min. temperatures in °C
- █ Precipitation totals in mm
Imperial conversion
J	F	M	A	M	J	J	A	S	O	N	D
0.8 66 45	1.5 70 48	1.2 79 55	0.8 95 66	0.8 102 73	2.4 104 79	9 95 79	4.6 91 77	3.4 91 73	0.2 90 64	0.5 79 54	0.8 70 45
- █ Average max. and min. temperatures in °F
- █ Precipitation totals in inches

The town experiences mainly three seasons as summer, monsoons and winter. Summers are quite hot and humid with temperatures ranging in the mid-thirties (Celsius). The highest recorded temperature in Apra is 40 degree Celsius and winters are quite severe and chilly, with the cold winds.

The lowest recorded temperature in Apra is 7 degree Celsius. However, the climate has undergone a drastic change in the past few years, with the mercury rising and the rainfall decreasing each year. January is recorded as the coolest month and June as warmest month.

Climate data for Apra
Month	Jan	Feb	Mar	Apr	May	Jun	Jul	Aug	Sep	Oct	Nov	Dec	Year
Mean daily maximum °C (°F)	19 (66)	21 (70)	26 (79)	35 (95)	39 (102)	40 (104)	35 (95)	33 (91)	33 (91)	32 (90)	26 (79)	21 (70)	30 (86)
Mean daily minimum °C (°F)	7 (45)	9 (48)	13 (55)	19 (66)	23 (73)	26 (79)	26 (79)	25 (77)	23 (73)	18 (64)	12 (54)	7 (45)	17 (63)
Average precipitation mm (inches)	20 (0.8)	38 (1.5)	30 (1.2)	20 (0.8)	20 (0.8)	61 (2.4)	229 (9.0)	118 (4.6)	86 (3.4)	5 (0.2)	13 (0.5)	20 (0.8)	660 (26.0)
Source: Apra Weather

== See also ==
- List of villages in India
