= Dosanjh Khurd =

- Village
- Location in Punjab, India Dosanjh Khurd (India)
- Coordinates: 31.1615952°N 76.0037273°E
- Country: India
- State: Punjab
- District: Shaheed Bhagat Singh Nagar

Government
  - Type: Panchayat raj
  - Body: Gram panchayat
- Elevation: 251 m (823 ft)

Population (2011)
  - Total: 1,077
- Sex ratio 534/543 ♂/♀

Languages
  - Official: Punjabi
- Time zone: UTC+5:30 (IST)
- PIN: 144511
- Telephone code: 01884
- ISO 3166 code: IN-PB
- Post office: Dosanjh Khurd
- Website: nawanshahr.nic.in

Dosanjh Khurd is a village in Shaheed Bhagat Singh Nagar district of Punjab State, India. It is located 3.9 kilometres (2.4 mi) away from Banga, 12 kilometres (7.5 mi) from Nawanshahr, 9.3 kilometres (5.8 mi) from district headquarter Shaheed Bhagat Singh Nagar and 103 kilometres (64 mi) from state capital Chandigarh. The village is administrated by Sarpanch an elected representative of the village.

== Demography ==
As of 2011, Dosanjh Khurd has a total number of 245 houses and population of 1077 of which 534 include are males while 543 are females according to the report published by Census India in 2011. The literacy rate of Dosanjh Khurd is 80.93%, higher than the state average of 75.84%. The population of children under the age of 6 years is 107 which is 9.94% of total population of Dosanjh Khurd, and child sex ratio is approximately 1184 as compared to Punjab state average of 846.

Most of the people are from Schedule Caste which constitutes 55.25% of total population in Dosanjh Khurd. The town does not have any Schedule Tribe population so far.

As per the report published by Census India in 2011, 321 people were engaged in work activities out of the total population of Dosanjh Khurd which includes 268 males and 53 females. According to census survey report 2011, 92.83% workers describe their work as main work and 7.17% workers are involved in Marginal activity providing livelihood for less than 6 months.

== Education ==
Amardeep Singh Shergill Memorial college Mukandpur and Sikh National College Banga are the nearest colleges. Lovely Professional University is 35 kilometres (22 mi) away from the village.

== Transport ==
Nawanshahr railway station is the nearest train station however, Garhshankar Junction railway station is 18 kilometres (11 mi) away from the village. Sahnewal Airport is the nearest domestic airport which located 59 kilometres (37 mi) away in Ludhiana and the nearest international airport is located in Chandigarh also Sri Guru Ram Dass Jee International Airport is the second nearest airport which is 143 kilometres (89 mi) away in Amritsar.

== See also ==
- List of villages in India
