= Katt =

- Village
- Location in Punjab, India Katt (India)
- Coordinates: 31.1812771°N 75.9023309°Ebj kreyhurjehwusg ku
- Country: India
- State: Punjab
- District: Shaheed Bhagat Singh Nagar

Government
  - Type: Panchayat raj
  - Body: Gram panchayat
- Elevation: 251 m (823 ft)

Population (2011)
  - Total: 1,029
- Sex ratio 530/499 ♂/♀

Languages
  - Official: Punjabi
- Time zone: UTC+5:30 (IST)
- PIN: 144505
- Telephone code: 01884
- ISO 3166 code: IN-PB
- Post office: Banga
- Website: nawanshahr.nic.in

Katt is a village in Shaheed Bhagat Singh Nagar district of Punjab State, India. It is located 11 kilometres (6.8 mi) away from postal head office Banga, 25 kilometres (16 mi) from Nawanshahr, 22 kilometres (14 mi) from district headquarter Shaheed Bhagat Singh Nagar and 115 kilometres (71 mi) from state capital Chandigarh. The village is administrated by Sarpanch an elected representative of the village.

== Demography ==
As of 2011, Katt has a total number of 213 houses and population of 1029 of which 530 are males while 499 are females according to the report published by Census India in 2011. The literacy rate of Katt is 82.47% higher than the state average of 75.84%. The population of children under the age of 6 years is 99 which is 9.62% of total population of Katt, and child sex ratio is approximately 1020 as compared to Punjab state average of 846.

Most of the people are from Schedule Caste which constitutes 38.87% of total population in Katt. The town does not have any Schedule Tribe population so far.

As per the report published by Census India in 2011, 309 people were engaged in work activities out of the total population of Katt which includes 382 males and 27 females. According to census survey report 2011, 88.67% workers describe their work as main work and 11.33% workers are involved in Marginal activity providing livelihood for less than 6 months.

== Education ==
The village has a Punjabi medium, co-ed upper primary school established in 2001. The school provide mid-day meal as per Indian Midday Meal Scheme. As per Right of Children to Free and Compulsory Education Act the school provide free education to children between the ages of 6 and 14. The village also has an privet un-aided Punjabi medium, co-ed primary with upper primary school established in 2003.

Amardeep Singh Shergill Memorial college Mukandpur and Sikh National College Banga are the nearest colleges. Industrial Training Institute for women (ITI Nawanshahr) is 25 kilometres (16 mi) The village is 72 kilometres (45 mi) from Indian Institute of Technology and 25 kilometres (16 mi) away from Lovely Professional University.

== Transport ==
Banga railway station is the nearest train station however, Phagwara Junction railway station is 17 kilometres (11 mi) away from the village. Sahnewal Airport is the nearest domestic airport which located 66 kilometres (41 mi) away in Ludhiana and the nearest international airport is located in Chandigarh also Sri Guru Ram Dass Jee International Airport is the second nearest airport which is 134 kilometres (83 mi) away in Amritsar.

== See also ==
- List of villages in India
