= GNA University =

Public Institute in Punjab, India

- Motto in English: Inspiring Innovation..
- Type: Private
- Established: 2014
- Chairman: S. Gursaran Singh
- Chancellor: S. Gurdeep Singh Sihra
- Vice-Chancellor: Dr. Hemant Sharma
- Undergraduates: Yes
- Postgraduates: Yes
- Doctoral students: yes
- Location: Phagwara, Punjab, India
- Campus: Urban
- Website: gnauniversity.edu.in

GNA University, located in Phagwara, Punjab, India, is a privately owned institution. It was established in 2014 under Act No. 17 of 2014 by the State Government of Punjab. The university is affiliated with the GNA Group, which is known for its manufacturing of automotive components.

== Courses Offered in GNA University ==
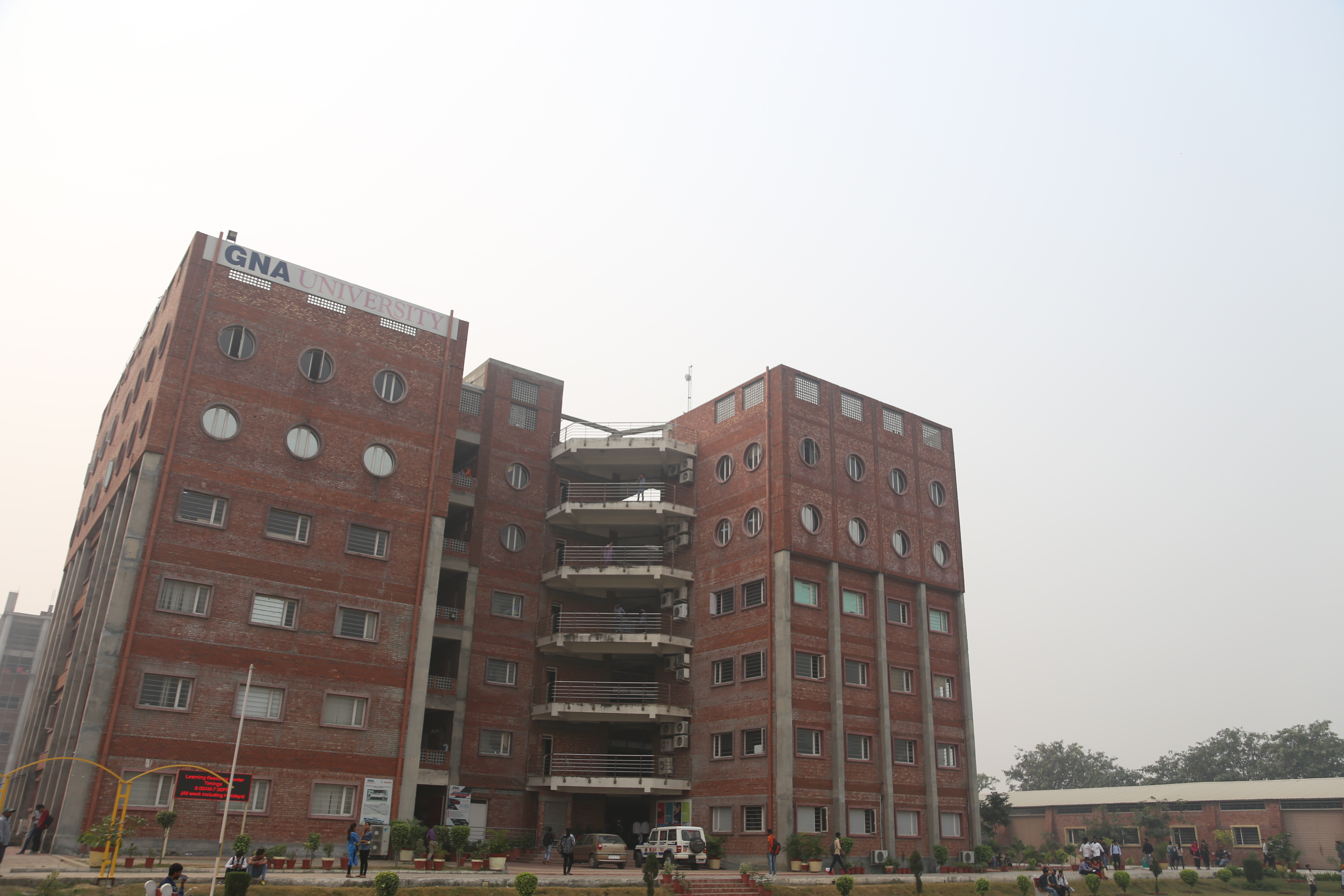
Administrative Block of GNA University.

GNA University provides a wide range of degree and certificate programs encompassing over 50 disciplines. It offers undergraduate, post-graduate and Doctoral Programs and a range of courses in various Departments, including Engineering, Management, Design and Mass Communication, Hotel Management, Pharmacy, computational science, Business studies, Allied Health Sciences and Physical Education. Additionally, the university provides diploma and certificate program specifically tailored to the CAD-CAM and engineering fields.

== Business School ==
GNA Business School focuses on the fields of Finance, Marketing, HR, Banking and Digital Marketing and includes Management Training.

== Tie-Ups ==
GNA University has established Memoranda of Understanding (MoUs) and partnerships. One such MoU has been signed with Cambridge University Press. The university has also entered into an MoU with TimesPro, an initiative by The Times of India, for placement purposes.

Furthermore, GNA University has signed an MoU with La Verne, California, for both short-term and long-term programm, as well as for faculty and student exchange programs. Another MoU has been signed with the National Stock Exchange of India Academy to offer management programs to students. The university has also partnered with LearnVern, an online learning portal. Additionally, GNA University has joined the Oracle Workforce Development Program (WDP), administered by Oracle University, USA.

== Events ==
GNA University organizes the Punjab Spell Bee Championship, a state-level competition.

The university also takes the initiative to organize the Punjab Film Festival, the first of its kind in the state, showcasing various films.

In November 2016, GNA University hosted the International Conference on Hospitality and Tourism, which was attended by distinguished individuals from the hospitality and tourism sectors. The event featured the presentation of over 30 research papers.

Furthermore, the university holds an annual sports meet each year.

One of the events for the university is the Diwali Mela. In 2024, the Diwali Mela was celebrated with PTC Punjabi in the campus premises, featuring Punjabi Singers and a performance by kulwinder Billa, a Punjabi singer and Actor.

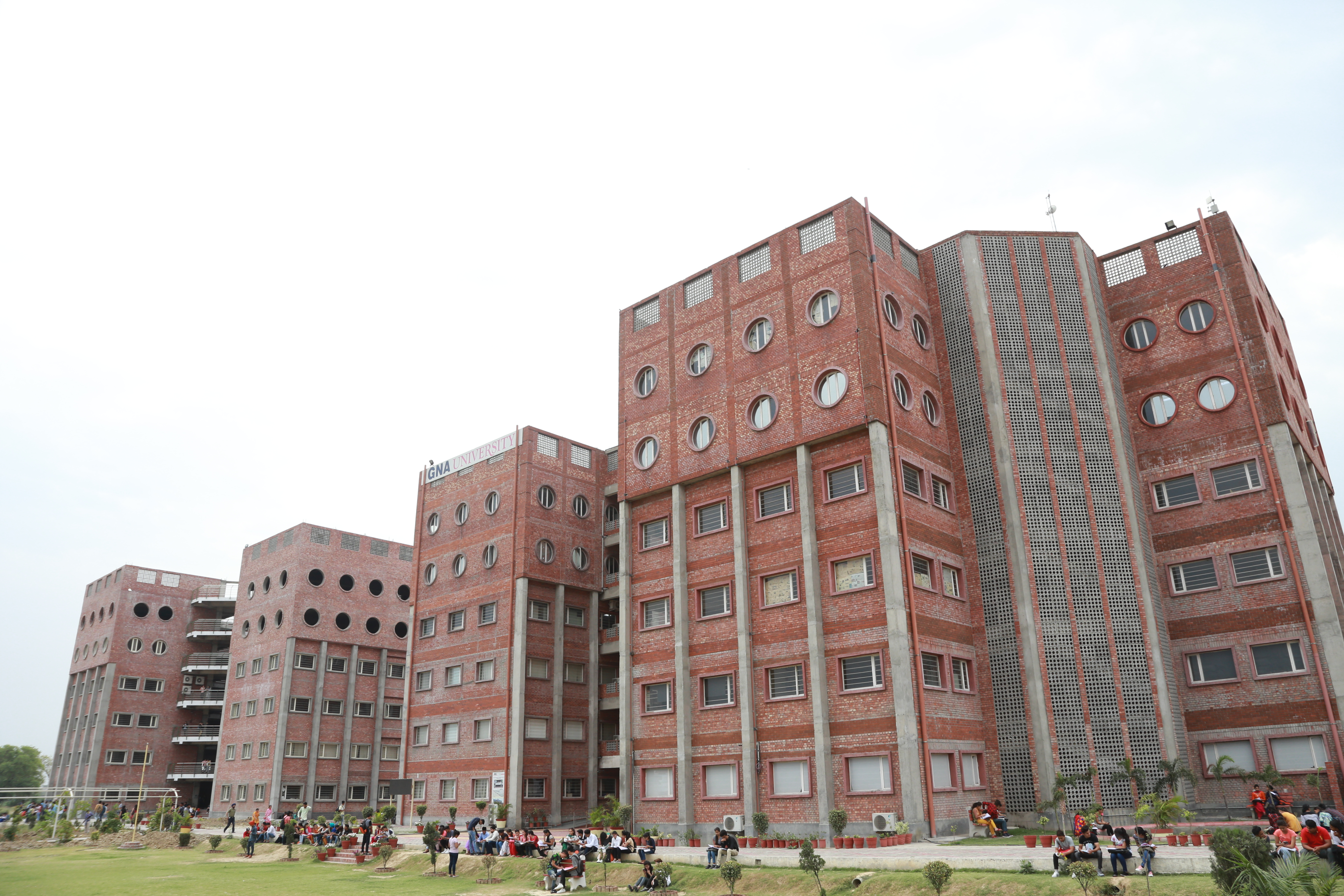
Exterior view of GNA University academic blocks
