= Mukandpur =

- village
- Location in Punjab, India Mukandpur (India)
- Coordinates: 31.1257747°N 75.9447956°E
- Country: India
- State: Punjab
- District: Nawanshahr

Population (2025)
  - Total: 4,100

Languages
  - Official: Punjabi
- Time zone: UTC+5:30 (IST)
- Vehicle registration: PB-
- Coastline: 0 kilometres (0 mi)

Mukandpur is a village near Banga, Nawanshahr district (also known as Shahid Bhagat Singh Nagar) in Punjab, India.

== Demographics ==
According to the 2001 Census, Mukandpur has a population of 3,785. Neighbouring villages include Jagatpur, Prozepur, Talwandi Phattu, Jhingran, Gunachaur, Shokar and Raipur Dabba, Hakimpur.

== Shopping ==
The village has expanded to include a shopping area near bus stand which serves the local villages.

== Welcome Gate at Mukandpur ==
Mukandpur has a welcome gate that shows Late Fauji Charan Das Selhi welcoming visitors. The translation under his gate says "Mukandpur Shehar Nagina, Aave Ik Din Rahe Mahina", roughly translating to: Mukandpur is a gem of a city, if one comes for a day, they'll end up staying for month.

Welcome Gate of Mukandpur Showing Late Fauji Charan Dass Selhi

== History of Mukandpur ==
The Gil (Shergill) Jat family of Mukandpur, located in the Nawanshahr area of Punjab's Jalandhar district at the time of the account, traces its history back to the reign of Mughal Emperor Shah Jahan in the 17th century. During this period, the family's ancestors were influential chaudhris in the Jalandhar Doab and gained control of approximately 70 villages along the northern bank of the Sutlej River. They established Mukandpur as their headquarters after gradually displacing the Jaijun Rajputs, who had previously controlled the territory.

According to family tradition, an ancestor named Ganga Ram challenged the Rajputs' ownership claims by tearing up their imperial land grant (sanad) during a public gathering. When summoned before Emperor Shah Jahan, Ganga Ram successfully defended his actions by arguing that the land would be better managed by the Jats. Although the emperor allowed Ganga Ram and his brothers to retain possession, the Rajputs refused to accept the decision. They eventually murdered Ganga Ram, leading to years of violent conflict between the two families. Ganga Ram's cousin, Chaju Mal, initially defeated the Rajputs and recovered substantial territory. However, the Rajputs later killed Chaju Mal and nearly every male member of the family, leaving only a young boy named Zorawar Singh alive.

Zorawar Singh's mother fled with him to her father's home for protection. Years later, the Mughal governor Dina Beg called upon her to assume control of 35 villages after the Rajputs failed to pay their government revenue obligations. The family subsequently recovered some of its former influence. Zorawar Singh's grandson, Bhup Singh, became the first Sikh in the family. As a young man, he followed the religious leader Bedi Sahib Singh of Una and accompanied him on military expeditions south of the Sutlej between 1794 and 1798. Unfortunately, Bhup Singh lost his eyesight in an accident before reaching his prime, which prevented him from attaining greater political or military prominence.

Bhup Singh's eldest son, Gulab Singh, died in 1838 while serving under Maharaja Ranjit Singh. Bhup Singh himself died in 1865. Following the establishment of British rule in Punjab, the family's broader claims to leadership were largely disregarded. However, the British recognized their rights in Mukandpur and granted Bhup Singh and his direct male descendants one-fourth of the village's annual revenue, valued at approximately Rs. 830. The family's jagir (hereditary land-revenue grant) subsequently passed to Bhup Singh's son, Partab Singh, who died in 1870, and then to Amar Singh.

At the time the original historical account was written, Sardar Amar Singh was the 17-year-old head of the Mukandpur family and was studying at Aitchison College. He owned approximately 1,080 ghumaos of land in Mukandpur and Sukar, in Nawanshahr tehsil. He also held the position of zaildar, a local administrative and revenue official, while remaining under the guardianship of his maternal uncle, Jawala Singh, the jagirdar of Thala.

== Education ==
=== Schools ===
There are 5 schools including Shri Guru Har Rai Public School and DAV school which has affiliation with the CBSE board.

=== Amardeep Singh Shergill Memorial College Mukandpur ===
Popular Punjabi singer Geeta Zaildar obtained his formal music education from Ustad Janab Shamshad Ali, a Music Professor of Amardeep Shergill Memorial College Mukandpur.

=== Amardeep Mela ===
The "Amardeep Mela" is organised annually by the Amardeep Singh Shergill Memorial College, Mukandpur. An annual feature of the College since its inception, the Mela lasts for four days.

== Mela Jagatpur Baba Ram Chand Ji (CHAUNKIAN DA MELA) ==
A famous fair also known as "Chaunkian da Mela" is held in Mukandpur and Jagatpur.A faqir named Sakhi Sarwar (Lakh Data) came to Balachaur. He started his journey from Rattewal and reached Jagatpur (a neighbour village) on his horse at Jagatpur darbar. Since then this fair is held in Mukandpur and Jagatpur lasts for nine days. A "Saang" starts from Rattewal and reaches Jagatpur . The leader of the "Saang" holds a flag which is called a "Togh".

== See also ==
Mukandpur village (now named as Chak No.65-GB in Tehsil Jaranwala, District Faisalabad, Pakistan)
