= Banga, India =

Town in Punjab, India

Banga
- Town
- Location in Punjab, India Banga (India) Banga (Asia)
- Coordinates: 31.19°N 75.99°E
- Country: India
- State: Punjab
- District: Shahid Bhagat Singh Nagar
- Founder: Baba Gola Maan

Government
  - Type: Democratic
- Elevation: 237 m (778 ft)

Population (2011)
  - Total: 20,906

Language
  - Official: Punjabi
- Time zone: UTC+5:30 (IST)
- PIN: 144 505
- Telephone code: 01823
- Vehicle registration: PB 78
- Sex ratio: 52:48 ♂/♀

Banga is a town and Municipal council in the Shaheed Bhagat Singh Nagar district of Punjab, India. Banga is also one of the sub-division (tehsil) headquarters of the district. Banga is located on Phagwara-Rupnagar section of National Highway 344A (Earlier State Highway 18 of Punjab). It is currently estimated to have a population of about 23,000 and is classified as a class 2 Municipality. The town also incorporates the former village of Jindowal apart from Banga town.

== History ==
Banga was founded by a Maan Jatt named Golia Maan who was also known as Banga& he came from village Paniani in Garhshankar. Chaudhary Mian Chuhar Mal Basra Jatt a heredity Mughal imperial Chaudhary/Jagirdar of Phagwara who held 300 villages also held Banga town and it's neighboring 60-70 villages, Phagwara Chuadhries held the Banga & it's neighbouring villages till Sardar Dharam Singh from one of the Sikh Misls captured Banga leaving 240 Villages under the Basra Chaudhries

== Geography ==
Banga is approximately 325 km from New Delhi, 100 km from the state capital Chandigarh, 104 km from Amritsar, 45 km from Jalandhar and 1400 km from Mumbai. It is in the northwest part of India; a few hundred kilometres south of Kashmir and to the west of the Himalayan foothills of Punjab and Himachal Pradesh. On a clear day, the snow-clad peaks of the Dhauladhar range are visible in the distant horizon. The Banga Railway station is located on the Jalandhar City/Jaijon Doaba Line of the Northern Railway at 13 km from Nawanshahr, 43 km from Jalandhar, and 45 km from Ludhiana. It is also linked by National Highway 344A with Nawanshahr and Phagwara Grand Trunk Road.

The Main Road of Banga

== Demographics ==
As of 2011 Indian Census, Banga had a total population of 20,906, of which 10,712 were males and 10,194 were females. Population within the age group of 0 to 6 years was 2,154. The total number of literates in Banga was 15,880, which constituted 75.9% of the population with male literacy of 78.7% and female literacy of 73.1%. The effective literacy rate of 7+ population of Banga was 84.7%, of which male literacy rate was 87.7% and female literacy rate was 81.5%. The Scheduled Castes population was 7,166. Banga had 4401 households in 2011.

As of 2001 India census, Banga had a population of 18,892 of which 9,810 were men and 9,082 were women. Banga has an average literacy rate of 75%, higher than the national average of 59.5%; with 79% of the males and 73% of females literate. 1,949 of the population was in the age range of 0–6 years.

In 1961, Banga's population was 10,212. It grew to 11,885 by 1971.

== Administration ==
Banga is a tehsil with a post of DSP and a SDM. A large number of properties in the town and in the surrounding villages are owned by non-resident Indians.

== Transport ==
=== By Road ===
There is large network of bus service of Punjab, Haryana, Chandigarh, Himachal, PEPSU & private operators. The city has its own bus stand. and Private car service also

=== By Rail ===
The Banga railway station is connected to mainly its own villages and also to neighbouring cities.

- Jalandhar
- Phagwara
- Nawashahar (SSB Nagar)
- Jaijon
- Chaheru
- Jalandhar cantt
- Garhshankar
- Amritsar

=== By Air ===
The nearly airports from the towns are

- Adampur Airport-AIP (45 km)
- Ludhiana Airport-LDH (71.9 km)
- Chandigarh Airport-IXC (106.7 km)
- Guru Ramdas International Airport, Amritsar-ATQ (139.7 km)
- Indira Gandhi International Airport, Delhi-DEL (350.2 km
