= Bundala =

Bundala Bundala Manjki
- Village
- Nickname: Inqalabian Pind
- Location in Punjab, India Bundala (India)
- Coordinates: 31°8′N 75°39′E
- Country: India
- State: Punjab
- District: Jalandhar

Government
  - Type: Sarpanch

Area
  - Total: 10.4736 km^{2} (4.0439 sq mi)
- Demonym(s): Bundalawaley, Bundalawalia

Languages
  - Official: Punjabi
- Time zone: UTC+5:30 (IST)
- PIN: 144034
- Vehicle registration: PB- 08

Bundala, also spelt as Bandala, is a large village in Jalandhar zillah situated in Tehsil Phillaur within the Indian state of Punjab and is located in the centre of the Doaba region of Punjab.

== History ==
=== Early history ===
The village can trace its establishment from around 1516 when it was built by two Bassi Jatt brothers, Bahhar and Chahar as a small Pind, they had 5 sons and they founded and named 5 Pattis of the village after their own names which are Patti Badal, Patti Niyewal, Patti Jodha, Patti sarja and Patti Surjia.

Bundala later became a part of the Dallewalia Misl led by Sardar Tara Singh Ghaiba as Misaldar during the Sikh Misl era he controlled whole Manjki, Dhak, Rakkar, Sirowal, areas of Malwa and till the Kandi.

=== Colonial Era ===
Bundala gained the title of Inqalabian Pind (Punjabi: ੲਿਨਕ਼ਲਾਬੀਆਂ ਪਿੰਡ) meaning village of revolutionaries which was attainted by the village following the daredevilry of Harkishan Singh Surjeet who was an Indian nationalist. During his early teens he became politically active in the Indian national liberation movement joining Bhagat Singh’s Naujawan Bharat Sabha movement in 1930 and on the anniversary of the martyrdom of Bhagat Singh, some of his followers had decided to pull down the British colonial flag that was flying above Hoshiarpur court and hoist the Indian tiranga. But when these people didn't turn up, 16 year old Surjeet himself hoisted the Indian flag at the court in Hoshiarpur, for which he was arrested and detained in a reformatory school for juvenile offenders in Delhi. When produced In court before the British magistrate and asked for his name he stated his name as London Tod Singh (ਲੰਡਨ ਤੋੜ ਸਿੰਘ) meaning 'one who smashes London'.

=== Post Independence ===
Bundala is known for its home grown small auto parts industry, Guru Nanak Auto Enterprises, which entered the village in 1947 once India had gained independence. It has grown to become the largest exporter of auto components in India with a net value of the company placed at £44 million ($55 million).

As per constitution of India and Panchyati Raaj Act, Bundala village is administrated by Sarpanch (Head of Village) who is elected representative of village.

== Location ==
The village is known for its progress in development and rapid expansion compared to its surrounding villages and lies on the Jandiala-Goraya road in northern Punjab above the Sutlej River and has good road links to the neighbouring cities of Phagwara, Nakodar, Phillaur and Jalandhar. Other major areas surrounding Bundala are: Jandiala Manjki to the north, Goraya to the east, Rurka Kalan to the south, and Nurmahal to the west. Neighbouring villages also include: Bhardwajian, Kahna Dhesian, Taggar, Pasli, Danduwal, Ade Kali, Saidowal and Pandori Musharkati.

Bundala's post code is 144034 with the village's head postal office in Phagwara.

== Transport ==
=== Road ===
Buses are available in the neighbouring cities of Phagwara and Nakodar that enable swift connections to travel into major settlements. Private minibus services are also available alongside taxis that offer routes to Sri Guru Ram Dass Jee International Airport in Amritsar and Shaheed e Azam Baghat Singh Airport in Chandigarh.

=== Rail ===
The nearest railway station to Bundala are the Thabalke and Nurmahal railway stations whilst the closest major railway line is at Jalandhar City railway station at a distance of 28 km providing the village to railway connections across Punjab. Longer distance routes connecting the village further can also be accessed from both Phagwara railway station and Ludhiana railway station with lines traveling into the national capital, Delhi, and other major cities in northern India.

=== Air ===
The nearest airport is Sahnewal Airport, located in Ludhiana however since May 2014 no flights have been running from Ludhiana airport. A planned international airport for the city is currently underway. The nearest international airport is Sri Guru Ram Dass Jee International Airport in Amritsar providing regional air fares as well as destinations in the Middle East, North America and Europe. Regular regional air services can also be caught from Shaheed e Azam Baghat Singh Airport which is currently in the progress of upgrading to deliver international capabilities.

== Demographics ==
Bundala village has a population of 6884 of which 3597 are males while 3287 are females as per the most recent census of 2011. Just over 10% of the village is aged 6 or under and the village has a higher literacy rate compared to the rest of Punjab. In 2011, the literacy rate of Bundala was 80.41% compared to 75.84% of Punjab. Bundala has a total of 1,448 houses.

The village has a largely Sikh yet diverse population of Hindus and Muslims that are served by 12 gurdwaras, a Hindu temple and a mosque. Local churches can be found in Jalandhar. Bundala also has a sizeable amount of its population that have relatives living abroad notably in the United Kingdom.

== Notable people ==
- Harkishen Singh Sujeet, Bundala born Indian independence activist and communist.
- Gurdas Ram Alam, Punjabi Language Poet
