= Ladhar Kalan =

Coordinates: 31°09′N 75°54′E

- Village
- Interactive map of Ladhar Kalan
- Country: India
- State: Punjab
- District: Jalandhar

Languages
  - Official: Punjabi
- Time zone: UTC+5:30 (IST)
- Vehicle registration: PB- 08

Ladhar Kalan is a village in Nurmahal. Nurmahal is a sub-tehsil in Jalandhar. Jalandhar is a district in the Indian state of Punjab.

== About ==
Ladhar Kalan lies on the Phillaur-Talwan road. The nearest railway station to Ladhar Kalan is Bilga railway station at a distance of 6 kilometres (4 mi).

== Post code ==
Ladhar Kalan's post office is Khokhewal whose post code is 144036.
