= Gorsian Nihal =

Gorsian Nihal Chuggian
- village
- Nickname: Chuggian
- Location in Punjab, India Gorsian Nihal (India)
- Coordinates: 31.026652°N 75.579557°E
- Country: India
- State: Punjab
- District: Jalandhar

Languages
  - Official: Punjabi
  - Regional: Punjabi
- Time zone: UTC+5:30 (IST)
- Telephone code: 01826
- Vehicle registration: PB- 08
- Nearest city: Nurmahal

Gorsian Nihal commonly known as Chuggian is a very small village in Nurmahal. Nurmahal is a sub tehsil in the city Jalandhar of Indian state of Punjab.

== About ==
Gorsian Nihal is almost 8 km from Nurmahal. The nearest main road to Gorsian Nihal is Nurmahal-Talwan road which is almost 4 km from the village. The nearest Railway station to this village is Nurmahal Railway station.

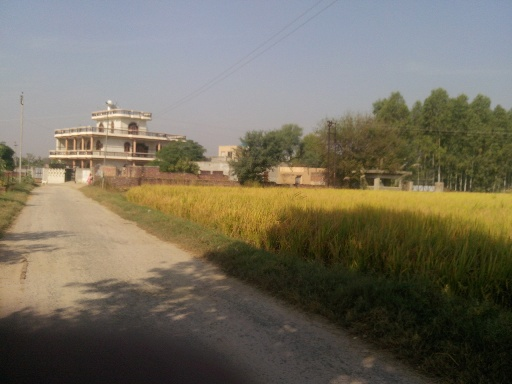
A distant view of Gorsian Nihal

== Post code & STD code ==
Gorsian Nihal's Post office is Ramewal whose post code is 144039 & its STD code is 01826.
