= Sunner Kalan =

- Village
- Location in Punjab, India Sunner Kalan (India)
- Coordinates: 31.1193°N 75.6303°E
- Country: India
- State: Punjab
- District: Jalandhar

Languages
  - Official: Punjabi
- Time zone: UTC+5:30 (IST)
- PIN: 144034
- Vehicle registration: PB- 08

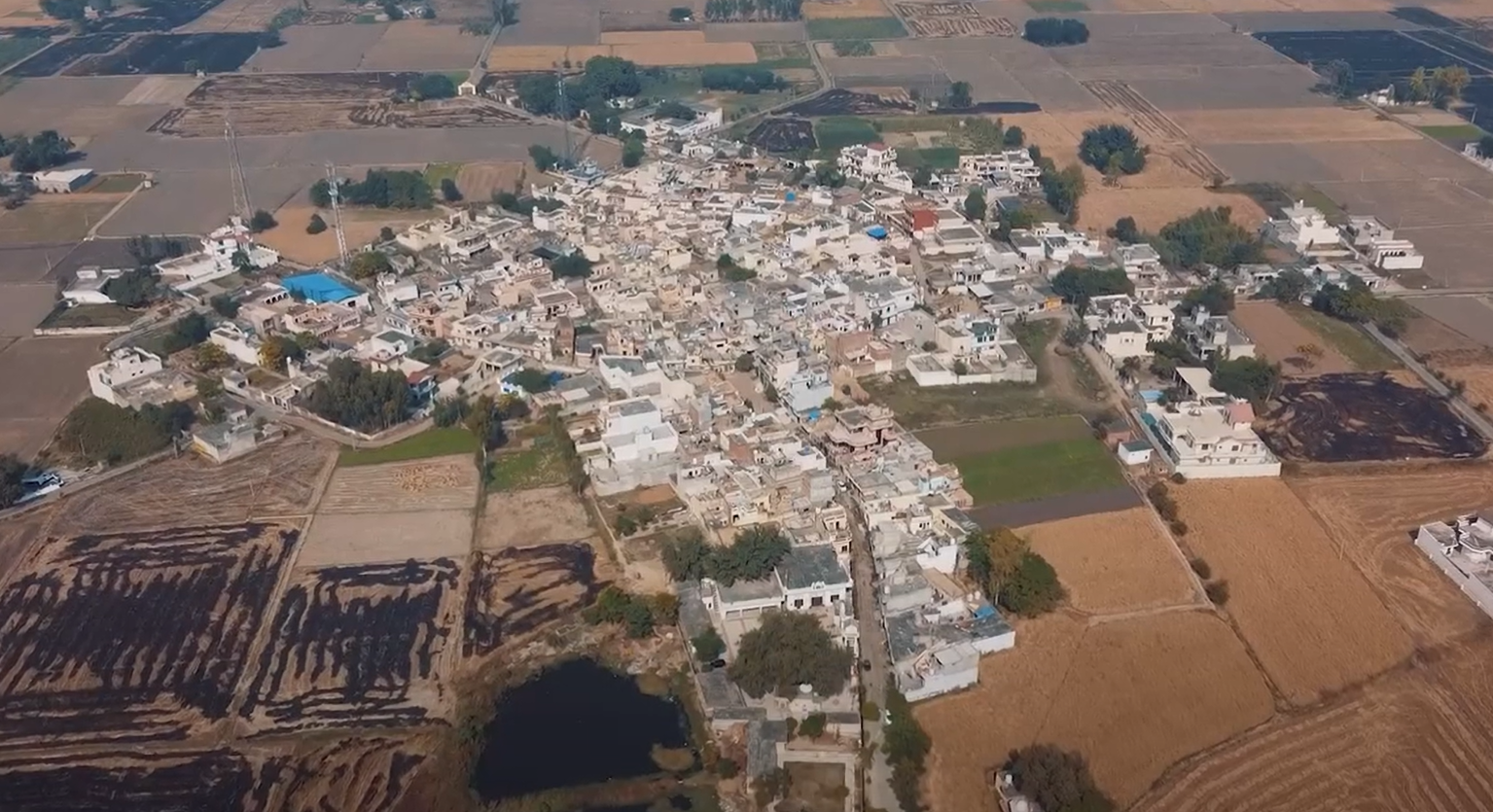
Drone shot of the entire village

Sunner Kalan (ਸੁੰਨੜ ਕਲਾਂ) is a village in the Jalandhar district of Punjab. It is a part of the Nurmahal tehsil in Jalandhar. The people that are from this village often have Sunner (surname) (ਸੁੰਨੜ), Jabber, Lagah, Bagha or Gahir as their surname. Many people from this village have settled abroad in countries like United Kingdom, Australia, New Zealand, Canada, and USA. It is not far from Nurmahal, and some of the surrounding villages include: Jago Sangha, Sidhu Hari Singh, Ade Kali, Mithra, Pabwan and Bundala. Sunner Kalan remained relatively stagnant growing slowly up to a population of 1,358 which was conducted by the 2011 Census of India.
