= Jamsher =

Jamsher Khas
- Village
- Location in Punjab, India Jamsher Khas (India)
- Coordinates: 31°14′07″N 75°37′02″E
- Country: India
- State: Punjab
- District: Jalandhar
- Tehsil: Jalandhar east

Government
  - Type: Panchayat raj
  - Body: Gram panchayat
- Elevation: 240 m (790 ft)

Population (2011)
  - Total: 8,437
- Sex ratio 4372/4065 ♂/♀

Languages
  - Official: Punjabi
- Time zone: UTC+5:30 (IST)
- Telephone: 144020
- ISO 3166 code: IN-PB
- Website: jalandhar.nic.in

Jamsher Khas is a village in Jalandhar district of Punjab State, India. It is located 43 kilometres (27 mi) from Shahkot, 25 kilometres (16 mi) from Nakodar, 13 kilometres (8.1 mi) from district headquarter Jalandhar and 146 kilometres (91 mi) from state capital Chandigarh. The village is administrated by a sarpanch who is an elected representative of village as per Panchayati raj (India).

== Transport ==
Jamsher Khas is well connected by various roads to the surrounding village, towns. Major District Road 82 (MDR 82) of Punjab is the main highway passing through the village that connects Jalandhar to Talwan via Jamsher Khas, Jandiala and Nurmahal. The major North-South Grand Trunk Road is only 8 km away from village of Jamsher.

=== Bus and Taxi ===
A lot of mini, private and state transport buses are available from ISBT Jalandhar to Jamsher khas on Jandiala-Nurmahal-Talwan Route. Other Interstate and State buses can be caught from Jalandhar interstate bus terminal. For a personal service, a minivan taxi or three wheeler service can be hired from the Jalandhar city.

=== Rail ===
Jamsher Khas train station lies on Jalandhar-Nakodar Stretch of Northern Railway zone. For further connections to longer distance services including to the union capital, Delhi, one can travel either to Jalandhar Cantt. or Jalandhar Railway Station.

=== Air ===
The village is 71 kilometres (44 mi) away from domestic airport in Ludhiana and the nearest international airport Shaheed Bhagat Singh International Airport, Chandigarh is located at 151 kilometers (93.8 miles) away, also Sri Guru Ram Dass Jee International Airport is the second nearest airport which is 109 kilometres (68 mi) away in Amritsar.
