= Khokhewal =

- Village
- Nickname: khokhewal
- Country: India
- State: Punjab
- District: Jalandhar

Languages
  - Official: Punjabi
- Time zone: UTC+5:30 (IST)
- PIN: 144036
- Vehicle registration: PB- 08

Khokhewal is a village in Nurmahal, a sub-tehsil in the Jalandhar district of the Indian state of Punjab.

== About ==
Khokhewal is 1 km from the Phillaur-Talwan road. The nearest railway station to Khokhewal is at Bilga, a distance of 4 km.

== Post code ==
Khokhewal's post code is 144036.
