= Thammanwal =

- Village
- Location in Punjab, India Thammanwal (India)
- Coordinates: 31.0235678°N 75.670073°E
- Country: India
- State: Punjab
- District: Jalandhar

Government
  - Type: Panchayat raj
  - Body: Gram panchayat
- Elevation: 240 m (790 ft)

Population (2011)
  - Total: 647
- Sex ratio 340/307 ♂/♀

Languages
  - Official: Punjabi
- Time zone: UTC+5:30 (IST)
- PIN: 144036
- ISO 3166 code: IN-PB
- Vehicle registration: PB- 08
- Website: jalandhar.nic.in

Thammanwal is a village in Jalandhar district of Punjab State, India. It is located 2.5 km from Mao Sahib, 12.9 km from Phillaur, 40.6 km from district headquarter Jalandhar and 133 km from state capital Chandigarh. The village is administrated by a sarpanch who is an elected representative of village as per Panchayati raj (India).

== Demography ==
As of 2011, the village has a total number of 143 houses and a population of 647 of which include 340 are males while 307 are females according to the report published by Census India in 2011. The literacy rate of the village is 69.84%, higher than state average of 75.84%. The population of children under the age of 6 years is 80 which is 12.36% of total population of the village, and child sex ratio is approximately 1222 higher than the state average of 846.

Most of the people are from Schedule Caste which constitutes 80.22% of total population in the village. The town does not have any Schedule Tribe population so far.

As per census 2011, 178 people were engaged in work activities out of the total population of the village which includes 162 males and 16 females. According to census survey report 2011, 94.38% workers describe their work as main work and 5.62% workers are involved in marginal activity providing livelihood for less than 6 months.

== Transport ==
Bilga railway station is the nearest train station however, Phillaur Junction train station is 12.2 km away from the village. The village is 41.2 km away from domestic airport in Ludhiana and the nearest international airport is located in Chandigarh also Sri Guru Ram Dass Jee International Airport is the second nearest airport which is 136 km away in Amritsar.
