= Nathewal =

- Village
- Location in Punjab Location in India
- Coordinates: 31°10′N 75°42′E
- Country: India
- State: Punjab
- District: Jalandhar
- Village: Nathewal

Government
  - Type: Panchayat raj
  - Body: Gram panchayat
- Elevation: 240 m (790 ft)

Population (2011)
  - Total: 1,642
- Sex ratio 561/523 ♂/♀

Languages
  - Official: Punjabi
- Time zone: UTC+5:30 (IST)
- PIN: 144633
- Telephone: 01824
- ISO 3166 code: IN-PB
- Vehicle registration: PB- 08
- Post Office: Sarhali
- Website: jalandhar.nic.in

Nathewal is a small village near the town of phagwara in the Jalandhar district in the Indian state of Punjab. The nearest villages include Rurkee, Ucha pind, Rurka Kalan, Sunner Khurd, Kahna Dhesian, Sarhali, Dhani Pind and Bundala.

== History ==
Kaushal / Koshal family

The name of the village originates from Nathuram, an original member of the Kaushal family.

The village is predominantly overseen by the Kaushal lineage, who are still sought after for advice, including matters of personal, family and business matters. They have acted as Lambardar (village head) for many generations. Members of the Kaushal clan have also emigrated to various parts of the world, including the U.K., U.S., Canada and Australia.

Lai Kaushal Jathere

Lai Kaushal Jathere is a shrine in the village, which had been constructed in the past, to commemorate and show respect to the ancestors of the village.

== Present ==
The sarpanch of the village is Jeet Ram and the panch are Lucky Kaushal, Satnam Rai, Boota Ram. The present Lambardar Sarwan Ram and Rajan Kaushal. Pallram Rai is Chokidar.

== School ==
The GPS School in Nathewal is a Government Primary school. This school holds the record of the most hygienic school in the Jalandhar district. This school is headed by Master Ajmer Singh.

== Crops ==
Crops grown in this region include wheat, rice, sugar cane, vegetables, maize and barley.
