= Sheikhupur, Punjab =

Sheikhupur
- Village
- Location in Punjab, India Sheikhupur (India)
- Coordinates: 31.0708588°N 75.7236599°E
- Country: India
- State: Punjab
- District: Jalandhar

Government
  - Type: Panchayat raj
  - Body: Gram panchayat
- Elevation: 240 m (790 ft)

Population (2011)
  - Total: 359
- Sex ratio 184/175 ♂/♀

Languages
  - Official: Punjabi
- Time zone: UTC+5:30 (IST)
- PIN: 144035
- ISO 3166 code: IN-PB
- Vehicle registration: PB- 08
- Website: jalandhar.nic.in

Sheikhupur is a village in Jalandhar district of Punjab State, India. It is located 15.9 km from Nurmahal, 11.3 km from Phillaur, 37.4 km from district headquarter Jalandhar and 122 km from state capital Chandigarh. The village is administrated by a sarpanch Satnam Singh Kheira who is an elected representative of village as per Panchayati raj (India).

== Transport ==
Partabpura railway station is the nearest train station; however, Phillaur Junction train station is 10.7 km away from the village. The village is 39.7 km away from domestic airport in Ludhiana and the nearest international airport is located in Chandigarh also Sri Guru Ram Dass Jee International Airport is the second nearest airport which is 136 km away in Amritsar.
