= Chuheki =

- Village
- Location in Punjab, India Chuheki (India)
- Coordinates: 31.1145692°N 75.5917525°E
- Country: India
- State: Punjab
- District: Jalandhar
- Tehsil: Phillaur

Government
  - Type: Panchayat raj
  - Body: Gram panchayat
- Elevation: 246 m (807 ft)

Population (2011)
  - Total: 2,062
- Sex ratio 1096/966 ♂/♀

Languages
  - Official: Punjabi
  - Other spoken: Hindi
- Time zone: UTC+5:30 (IST)
- PIN: 144039
- Telephone: 01826
- ISO 3166 code: IN-PB
- Vehicle registration: PB- 08
- Website: jalandhar.nic.in

Chuheki is a village in Jalandhar district of Punjab State, India. It is located 2.4 km away from Nurmahal, 24 km from Phillaur, 26 km from district headquarter Jalandhar and 137 km from state capital Chandigarh. The village is administrated by a sarpanch who is an elected representative of village as per Panchayati raj (India).

== Education ==
The village has a Punjabi medium, co-ed upper primary school (GMS Chuheki). The school provides mid-day meal as per Indian Midday Meal Scheme and the meal prepared in school premises and it was found in 1996.

== Demography ==
As of 2011, Chuheki has a total number of 408 houses and population of 2062 of which 1096 are males while 966 are females according to the report published by Census India in 2011. Literacy rate of Chuheki is 74.22%, lower than the state average of 75.84%. The population of children under the age of 6 years is 235 which is 10.40% of the total population of Chuheki, and child sex ratio is approximately 767 higher than the state average of 846.

Most of the people are from Schedule Caste which constitutes 71.63% of the total population in Chuheki. The town does not have any Schedule Tribe population so far.

As per census 2011, 905 people were engaged in work activities out of the total population of Chuheki which includes 643 males and 262 females. According to census survey report 2011, 95.96% workers describe their work as main work and 43.65% workers are involved in Marginal activity providing a livelihood for less than 6 months.

== Transport ==
Nurmahal railway station is the nearest train station however, Phillaur train station is 23.8 km away from the village. The village is 55 km away from domestic airport in Ludhiana and the nearest international airport is located in Chandigarh also Sri Guru Ram Dass Jee International Airport is the second nearest airport which is 122 km away in Amritsar.
