= Rara, Punjab =

Rara
- Village
- Location in Punjab, India Rara (India)
- Coordinates: 31.072333°N 75.6448602°E
- Country: India
- State: Punjab
- District: Jalandhar

Government
  - Type: Panchayat raj
  - Body: Gram panchayat
- Elevation: 240 m (790 ft)

Population (2011)
  - Total: 8
- Sex ratio 7/1 ♂/♀

Languages
  - Official: Punjabi
- Time zone: UTC+5:30 (IST)
- PIN: 144036
- ISO 3166 code: IN-PB
- Vehicle registration: PB- 08
- Website: jalandhar.nic.in

Rara is a village in Jalandhar district of Punjab State, India. It is located 7.8 km (4.8 mi) from Nurmahal, 16.4 km (10.2 mi) from Phillaur, 35.8 km (22.2 mi) from the district headquarters at Jalandhar and 127 km (79 mi) from the state capital at Chandigarh. The village is administrated by a sarpanch, who is an elected representative.

== Transport ==
Bilga railway station is the nearest train station. The larger Phillaur Junction station is 15.8 km (9.8 mi) from the village. The village is 44.8 km (27.8 mi) from the domestic airport at Ludhiana; the nearest international airport is located in Chandigarh.
