= Anita Rani =

British broadcaster and journalist (born 1977)

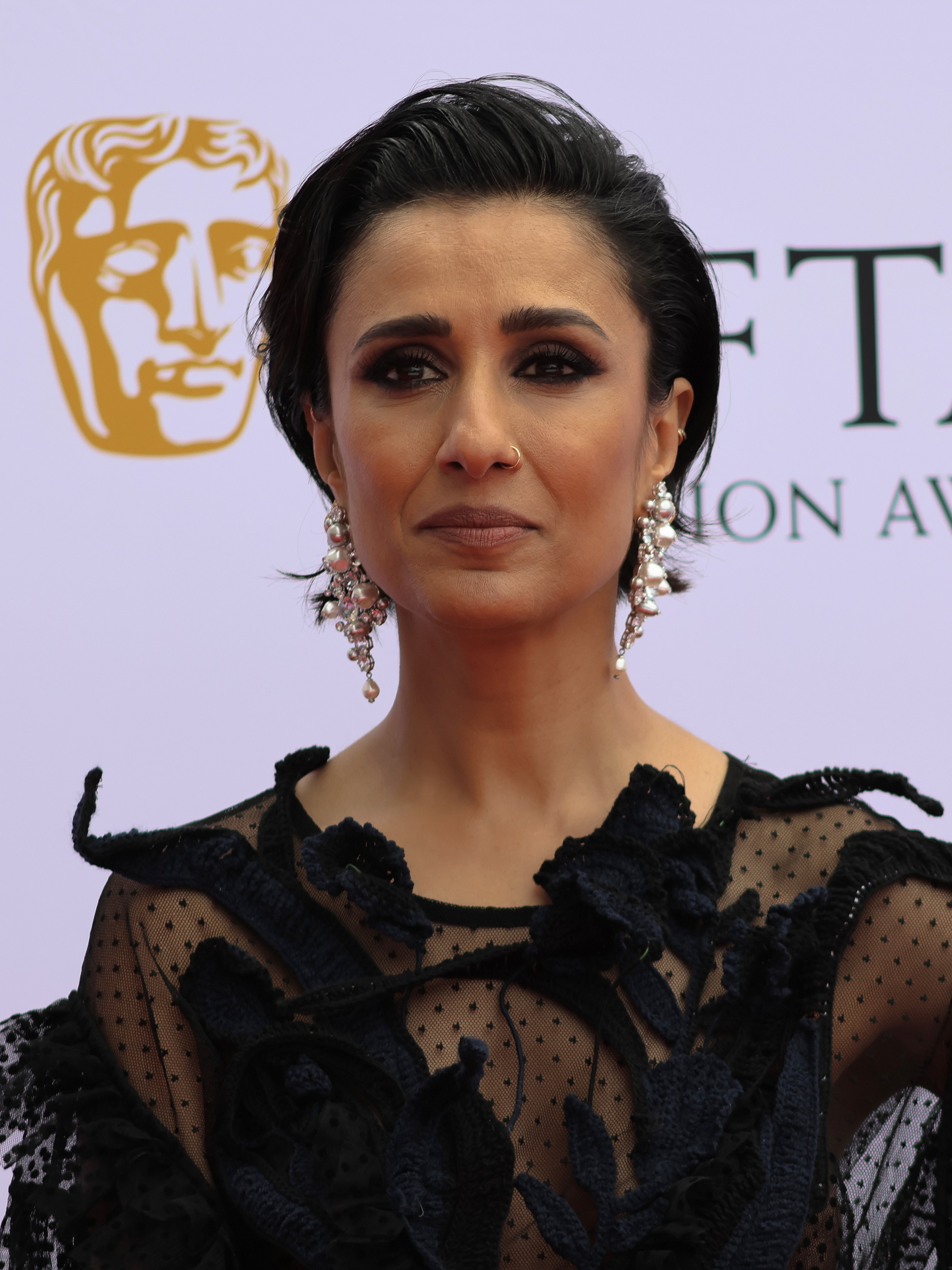
- Rani in 2026
- Born: Anita Rani Nazran; 25 October 1977 (age 48); Bradford, West Yorkshire, England
- Education: University of Leeds
- Occupations: Journalist, radio presenter, television presenter/personality
- Years active: 2002–present
- Employer(s): BBC, Channel 4
- Title: Chancellor of University of Bradford
- Spouse: Bhupinder Rehal (m. 2009; sep. 2023)

Anita Rani Nazran (Punjabi: ਅਨੀਤਾ ਰਾਣੀ ਨਜ਼ਰਾਂ; born 25 October 1977), better known as Anita Rani, is a British radio and television presenter.

== Early life ==
Rani was born in Bradford, West Yorkshire, and grew up in Heaton and Odsal. Her parents were Indian-born, and her father, Balvinder Singh Nazran, immigrated to the UK at the age of four. Her father is a Hindu and her mother is a Sikh. Her parents started a textile manufacturing business, where Rani and her siblings worked at times in their youth. The business failed in the 1990s.

In an episode of Who Do You Think You Are? first broadcast on 1 October 2015 on BBC One, Rani investigated the history of her maternal grandfather Sant Singh (born Sant Ram, in Sarhali in 1916, died 1975), in particular learning more about his first wife and children, who died during the violence of the Partition of India in 1947, while he was a thousand miles away in Kirkee, serving in the British Indian Army, which he had joined in August 1942. Rani discovered that her maternal grandfather was born into a Hindu Taggar family, but converted to Sikhism as a young man in accordance with a custom prevalent at the time. He continued to serve in the Indian Army after Indian independence, retiring as a subedar (equivalent to a warrant officer) in 1970.

Rani was educated at Bradford Girls' Grammar School, an independent school. Rani developed an early interest in journalism, hosting her first show at the age of 14 on Sunrise Radio. She went to the University of Leeds, where she studied broadcasting.

== Career ==
After leaving university Rani worked as a researcher for the BBC and other organisations.

In 2002, Rani presented The Edit, a live news and entertainment programme on Channel Five. She presented a number of pop shows on Five, including Spring Break Live, Party in the Park and Pop City Live, as well as being a freelance journalist for 5 News. In spring 2003, she fronted The State We're In, a satirical current affairs programme on BBC Three. She also presented the first Poetry Slam on the same channel. She was nominated as Best On Screen Personality at the Royal Television Society Midlands awards in 2005.

Rani joined the BBC Asian Network radio station in March 2005, and became presenter of the weekend Hot Breakfast show. From April 2006 to March 2007 she presented the weekday morning talkback programme Anita Rani on the BBC Asian Network on the station.

In 2005, she was a regular reporter on The Cricket Show on Channel 4. From 20 May 2006, she was a co-presenter of Desi DNA, an arts programme on BBC Two catering to the Desi (British Asian) community. She launched Destination Three, a late night entertainment zone on BBC Three. In May 2006, Rani joined Sky Sports where she became co-presenter with Simon Thomas on the Cricket AM show each Saturday morning.

Rani presented My Generation Next, shown on BBC News 24 between 2 and 9 December 2006. She covered for Anita Anand on the late-evening weekday show on BBC Radio 5 Live in March and September 2007 and has presented World Have Your Say on the BBC World Service and Weekend Breakfast on Five Live. She has also covered on various shows for BBC Radio 6 Music. In August 2008, Rani was the co-presenter of Rogue Restaurants on BBC One and joined the team of roving reporters on The One Show. From 2 March 2009 she co-presented BBC One's Watchdog, succeeding Julia Bradbury.

From 2011 until 2015, Rani presented Four Rooms where unique objects are offered for sale to specialist dealers. In 2016, she was replaced by Sarah Beeny.

Rani co-presented with Justin Rowlatt the two-part documentary travelogue India on Four Wheels, a road trip around India sampling the changes and problems that growing car usage has brought to the country in the last two decades. This 2011 show was followed by similar collaborations with Rowlatt, China on Four Wheels (aired September 2012) and Russia on Four Wheels (aired January 2014).

In 2012, Rani took part in BBC's Great Sport Relief Bake Off, winning the competition. In 2013, she co-presented the live broadcast project Airport Live from Heathrow Airport. In April 2014, she was one of the presenters of BBC Two's Escape to the Continent.

Since 2015, she has co-hosted BBC's Countryfile. Rani co-presented The World's Busiest Railway 2015, alongside Dan Snow and Robert Llewellyn. The four-part series aired on BBC Two. In 2016, she co-presented The Refugee Camp: Our Desert Home for BBC Two and presented This Morning for four Fridays in the summer alongside James Martin.

Between October and December 2015, Rani participated in the thirteenth series of Strictly Come Dancing, partnered with Gleb Savchenko and reached the semi-final.

In 2016, Rani co-presented the three-part BBC Two series New York: America's Busiest City alongside Ant Anstead and Ade Adepitan. She presented My Family, Partition and Me: India 1947, a two-part programme on BBC One. She co-presented World's Busiest Cities in 2017 with Dan Snow and Ade Adepitan.

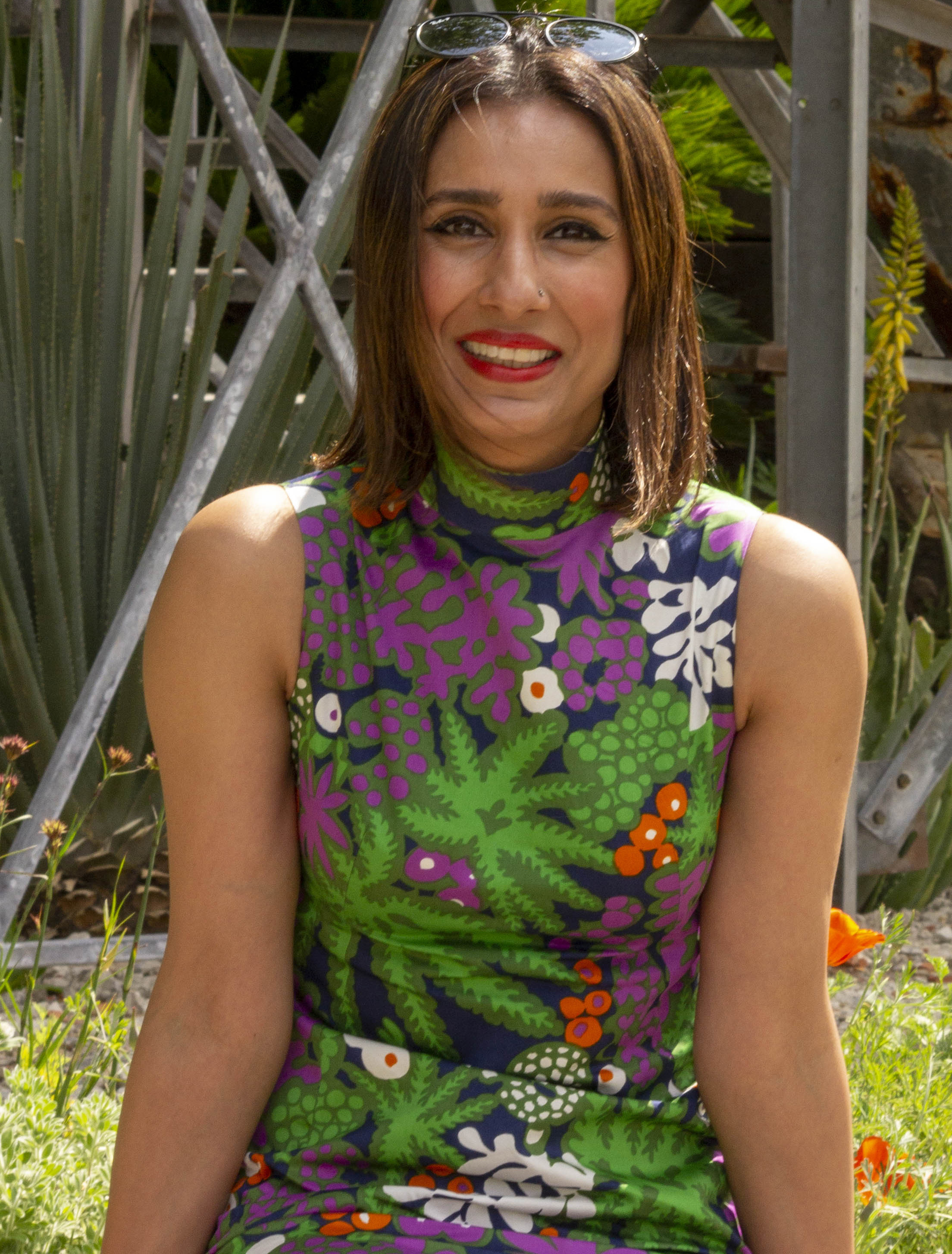
Rani in 2019

In 2018, she was honoured with Outstanding Achievement in Television at The Asian Awards. Rani also serves as an ambassador for The Scout Association in the UK.

Since 15 January 2021, Rani has presented the Friday and Saturday editions of BBC Radio 4's Woman's Hour.

On 24 February 2021, Rani was a guest on BBC Radio 4 interview show Gossip And Goddesses With Granny Kumar, where she said that her Indian name is Neetu, after the Indian actress Neetu Singh.

In May 2021, Rani became the presenter of Channel 4's daytime quiz show The Answer Trap.

In July 2021, Rani published her memoir The Right Sort of Girl, which made The Sunday Times Bestseller List.

In October 2022, Rani presented Channel 4's Aldi's Next Big Thing, alongside Chris Bavin and Julie Ashfield.

In April 2024, Rani was a guest co-host on the BBC quiz show Pointless alongside Alexander Armstrong.

In May 2025, Rani presented The Brontës by Anita Rani: Sisters of Disruption, a Sky Arts documentary about the Brontë sisters.

In November 2025 Rani and her father competed in the BBC's Celebrity Race Across the World series 3, when they came in third place.

== Personal life ==
In 2009 Rani married Bhupinder Rehal, a technology executive for an advertising agency. In 2020, Rani spoke of a miscarriage that she suffered in 2018. In September 2023, it was reported the couple had ended their relationship. Rani subsequently wrote about beginning the "Chapter Two" of her life. Rani lives in Hackney, east London.

On 8 March 2021, Rani announced that she had been made a United Nations High Commissioner for Refugees Goodwill Ambassador. In March 2023 Rani was installed as new chancellor of the University of Bradford.

Rani was made an Honorary Doctor of Letters by the University of Leeds in July 2023.

== Filmography ==
Year	Title	Role
2003	Network East Late	Co-presenter
2008	Rogue Restaurants	Co-presenter
2009-2010	Watchdog	Co-presenter
2011	India on Four Wheels	Co-presenter
2011, 2012, 2014 - present	The One Show	Stand-in presenter, reporter
2011-2015	Four Rooms	Presenter
2012	The Great Sport Relief Bake Off	Contestant
2012	China on Four Wheels	Co-presenter
2013	Airport Live	Co-presenter
2013	No Sex Please, We're Japanese	Presenter
2014	Russia on Four Wheels	Presenter
2014	The Great Culture Quiz	Presenter
2014-present	Escape to the Continent	Co-presenter
2015-present	Countryfile	Co-presenter
2015	The World's Busiest Railway	Co-presenter
2015	Strictly Come Dancing	Contestant
2016	The Refugee Camp: Our Desert Home	Co-presenter
2016	This Morning Summer	Co-presenter
2016	New York: America's Busiest City	Co-presenter
2017	BBC Young Dancer	Co-presenter
2017	One Love Manchester	Co-presenter
2017	My Family, Partition and Me: India 1947	Presenter
2017	World's Busiest Cities	Co-presenter
2017	Richard Osman's House of Games	Contestant
2018	The Royal Wedding of Prince Harry and Meghan Markle	Guest presenter
2018	Bollywood: The World's Biggest Film Industry	Presenter, co-creator
2019	Today at the Great Yorkshire Show	Co-presenter
2020	Celebrity Gogglebox	Herself
2020	The Chase Celebrity Special	Contestant
2020	Blankety Blank Christmas Special	Contestant
2020	The Victorian House of Arts and Crafts	Presenter
2021	James Martin’s Saturday Morning	Guest
2021	A Service Of Celebration For Commonwealth Day	Presenter
2021	The Answer Trap	Presenter
2021	All Star Musicals	Competitor
2021-present	Saved by a Stranger	Presenter
2021-present	Secret Spenders	Presenter
2021-present	Britain By Beach	Presenter
2021, 2023	The Wheel	Celebrity expert
2022	The Platinum Pageant	Reporter
2022	Fastest Finger First	Host
2022	The State Funeral of HM Queen Elizabeth II	Reporter
2022-present	Aldi’s Next Big Thing	Co-presenter
2023	Coronation of His Majesty The King and Her Majesty The Queen Consort	Reporter
2024	D-Day 80: The Allies Prepare	Presenter
2024-present	My Life at Christmas with Anita Rani	Presenter
2025	The Brontës by Anita Rani: Sisters of Disruption	Presenter
2025	Celebrity Race Across the World	Contestant

== Bibliography ==
- The Right Sort of Girl (Blink Publishing, 2021, ISBN 978-1788704236)
- Baby Does A Runner (Zaffre, 2023, ISBN 978-1838779405)

== See also ==
- List of British Sikhs
