= Darapur, India =

Darapur
- Village
- Location in Punjab, India Darapur (India)
- Coordinates: 31.0734114°N 75.7077858°E
- Country: India
- State: Punjab
- District: Jalandhar

Government
  - Type: Panchayat raj
  - Body: Gram panchayat
- Elevation: 237 m (778 ft)

Population (2011)
  - Total: 904
- Sex ratio 472/432 ♂/♀

Languages
  - Official: Punjabi
- Time zone: UTC+5:30 (IST)
- PIN: 144035
- Telephone: 01821
- ISO 3166 code: IN-PB
- Vehicle registration: PB- 08
- Post Office: Partappura
- Website: jalandhar.nic.in

Darapur is a village in Jalandhar district of Punjab State, India. It is located 16 km away from Nurmahal, 11.5 km from Phillaur, 37 km from district headquarter Jalandhar and 121 km from state capital Chandigarh. The village is administrated by a sarpanch who is an elected representative of village as per Panchayati raj (India).

== Education ==
The village has a Punjabi medium, co-ed primary school (PRI Darapur). The school provide mid-day meal as per Indian Midday Meal Scheme and the meal prepared in school premises and it was found in 1955.

== Demography ==
According to the report published by Census India in 2011, Darapur has a total number of 175 houses and population of 904 of which include 472 males and 432 females. Literacy rate of Darapur is 85.15%, higher than state average of 75.84%. The population of children under the age of 6 years is 89 which is 9.85% of total population of Darapur, and child sex ratio is approximately 648 lower than state average of 846.

Most of the people are from Schedule Caste which constitutes 57.74% of total population in Darapur. The town does not have any Schedule Tribe population so far.

As per census 2011, 295 people were engaged in work activities out of the total population of Darapur which includes 276 males and 19 females. According to census survey report 2011, 99.32% workers describe their work as main work and 0.68% workers are involved in marginal activity providing livelihood for less than 6 months.

== Transport ==
Partabpura railway station is the nearest train station; however, Phillaur Junction train station is 11.5 km away from the village. The village is 42 km away from domestic airport in Ludhiana and the nearest international airport is located in Chandigarh also Sri Guru Ram Dass Jee International Airport is the second nearest airport which is 139 km away in Amritsar.
