= Hardo Sheikh =

- Village
- Location in Punjab, India Hardo Sheikh (India)
- Coordinates: 31.1266847°N 75.5466502°E
- Country: India
- State: Punjab
- District: Jalandhar

Government
  - Type: Panchayat raj
  - Body: Gram panchayat
- Elevation: 240 m (790 ft)

Population (2011)
  - Total: 1,095
- Sex ratio 558/537 ♂/♀

Languages
  - Official: Punjabi
- Time zone: UTC+5:30 (IST)
- PIN: 144039
- Telephone: 01821
- ISO 3166 code: IN-PB
- Vehicle registration: PB- 08
- Post Office: Nurmahal
- Website: jalandhar.nic.in

Hardo Sheikh is a village in Jalandhar district of Punjab State, India. It is located 6 km away from postal head office Nurmahal, 8.7 km from Nakodar, 28 km from district headquarter Jalandhar and 137 km from state capital Chandigarh. The village is administrated by a sarpanch who is an elected representative of village as per Panchayati raj (India).

== Education ==
The village has a Punjabi medium, co-ed primary school (PRI Hardo Sheikh). The school provide mid-day meal as per Indian Midday Meal Scheme and the meal prepared in school premises and it was found in 1948.

== Demography ==
According to the report published by Census India in 2011, Hardo Sheikh has a total number of 212 houses and population of 1095 of which include 558 males and 537 females. Literacy rate of Hardo Sheikh is 79.84%, higher than state average of 75.84%. The population of children under the age of 6 years is 104 which is 9.50% of total population of Hardo Sheikh, and child sex ratio is approximately 1419 higher than state average of 846.

Most of the people are from Schedule Caste which constitutes 76.89% of total population in Hardo Sheikh. The town does not have any Schedule Tribe population so far.

As per census 2011, 468 people were engaged in work activities out of the total population of Hardo Sheikh which includes 330 males and 138 females. According to census survey report 2011, 65.60% workers describe their work as main work and 34.40% workers are involved in marginal activity providing livelihood for less than 6 months.

== Transport ==
Nurmahal railway station is the nearest train station; however, Phillaur Junction train station is 27 km away from the village. The village is 54.4 km away from domestic airport in Ludhiana and the nearest international airport is located in Chandigarh also Sri Guru Ram Dass Jee International Airport is the second nearest airport which is 125 km away in Amritsar.
