= Mithra, Punjab =

Mithra
- Village
- Location in Punjab, India Mithra (India)
- Coordinates: 31.1179038°N 75.6307303°E
- Country: India
- State: Punjab
- District: Jalandhar

Government
  - Type: Panchayat raj
  - Body: Gram panchayat
- Elevation: 240 m (790 ft)

Population (2011)
  - Total: 1,579
- Sex ratio 793/786 ♂/♀

Languages
  - Official: Punjabi
- Time zone: UTC+5:30 (IST)
- PIN: 144034
- Telephone: 01826
- ISO 3166 code: IN-PB
- Vehicle registration: PB- 08
- Website: jalandhar.nic.in

Mithra is a village in Jalandhar district of Punjab State, India. It is located 24 km from Phillaur, 27 km from district headquarter Jalandhar and 138 km from state capital Chandigarh. The village is administrated by a sarpanch, who is an elected representative.

== Demography ==
According to the report published by Census India in 2011, Mithra has a total number of 307 houses and population of 1579 of which include 793 males and 786 females. Literacy rate of Mithra is 78.40%, higher than state average of 75.84%. The population of children under the age of 6 years is 158 which is 10.01% of total population of Mithra, and child sex ratio is approximately 927 higher than state average of 846.

Most of the people are from Schedule Caste which constitutes 50.54% of total population in Mithra. The town does not have any Schedule Tribe population so far.

As per census 2011, 468 people were engaged in work activities out of the total population of Mithra which includes 418 males and 50 females. According to census survey report 2011, 89.10% workers describe their work as main work and 10.90% workers are involved in marginal activity providing livelihood for less than 6 months.

== Transport ==
Nurmahal railway station is the nearest train station; however, Phillaur Junction train station is 23.8 km away from the village. The village is 56 km away from domestic airport in Ludhiana and the nearest international airport is located in Chandigarh also Sri Guru Ram Dass Jee International Airport is the second nearest airport which is 123 km away in Amritsar.
