= Bhandal Buta =

- Village
- Location in Punjab, India Bhandal Buta (India)
- Coordinates: 31.1304407°N 75.5643451°E
- Country: India
- State: Punjab
- District: Jalandhar

Government
  - Type: Panchayat raj
  - Body: Gram panchayat
- Elevation: 246 m (807 ft)

Population (2011)
  - Total: 709
- Sex ratio 339/370 ♂/♀

Languages
  - Official: Punjabi
- Time zone: UTC+5:30 (IST)
- PIN: 144039
- ISO 3166 code: IN-PB
- Vehicle registration: PB- 08
- Website: jalandhar.nic.in

Bhandal Buta is a village in Jalandhar district of Punjab State, India. It is located 10 kilometres (6.2 mi) from Nakodar, 27 kilometres (17 mi) from Phillaur, 28.5 kilometres (17.7 mi) from the district headquarters, Jalandhar, and 137 kilometres (85 mi) from the state capital, Chandigarh. The village is administrated by a sarpanch, who is an elected representative of the village in line with the Panchayati raj.

== Demography ==
According to Census India, in 2011, Bhandal Buta had 147 houses and a population of 709 (339 males and 370 females). The literacy rate was 76.32%, higher than the state average of 75.84%. The number of children under the age of 6 years was 84 (11.85% of the population) and the child sex ratio was approximately 1211 as compared to Punjab state average of 846.

Schedule castes members constituted 52.19% of the total population. The town did not have any schedule tribe population.

202 people were engaged in work activities (179 males and 23 females). 96.04% workers described their work as main work, and 3.96% workers were involved in marginal activities, providing a livelihood for less than 6 months, none of whom were agricultural labourers.

== Education ==
The village has a co-educational primary school founded in 1976. It provides a mid-day meal under the Indian Midday Meal Scheme.

== Transport ==
=== Rail ===
The nearest railway station is at Nurmahal. Phillaur Junction railway station is 26 kilometres (16 mi) away.

=== Air ===
The nearest domestic airport is 57.9 kilometres (36.0 mi) away in Ludhiana and the nearest international airport is located in Chandigarh. Sri Guru Ram Das Ji International Airport is the second nearest airport, 124 kilometres (77 mi) away in Amritsar.
