= Major District Road 82 (Punjab) =

District road in India

Route information
- Maintained by Punjab Works Department, Punjab, State Government of Punjab, India
- Length: 30.73 km (19.09 mi)

Major junctions
- From: Jalandhar, Punjab
- To: Talwan, Punjab

Location
- Country: India
- Districts: Jalandhar District
- Primary destinations: Jalandhar Cantonment, Jamsher, Jandiala, Nurmahal

Highway system
- Roads in India; Expressways; National; State; Asian; State Highways in

Major District Road 82, is a District Road in Jalandhar District in the state of Punjab in India. This road is also named by Jalandhar Nurmahal Highway.

== Route description ==
The route of the highway is Jalandhar Cantonment-Jamsher-Jandiala-Nurmahal-Talwan.

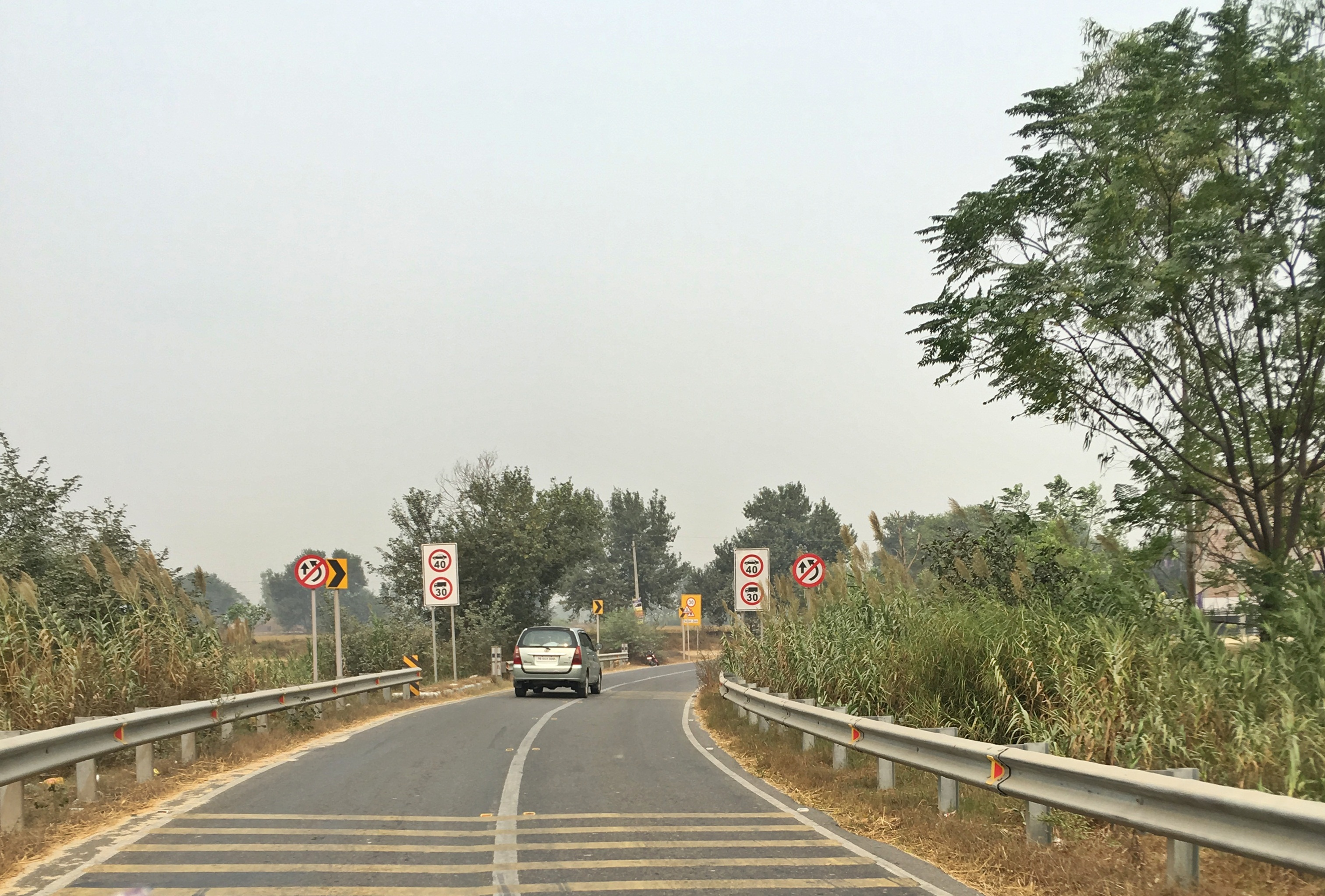
Traffic rules and signs on MDR 82 near Kangniwal, Punjab
