= Pabwan =

- Village
- Location in Punjab, India Pabwan (India)
- Coordinates: 31.1209634°N 75.6088581°E
- Country: India
- State: Punjab
- District: Jalandhar

Government
  - Type: Panchayat raj
  - Body: Gram panchayat
- Elevation: 240 m (790 ft)

Population (2011)
  - Total: 1,081
- Sex ratio 534/547 ♂/♀

Languages
  - Official: Punjabi
- Time zone: UTC+5:30 (IST)
- PIN: 144034
- Telephone: 01821
- ISO 3166 code: IN-PB
- Vehicle registration: PB- 08
- Post Office: Nurmahal
- Website: jalandhar.nic.in

Pabwan is a village in Jalandhar district of Punjab State, India. It is located 4.9 km from postal head office in Nurmahal, 25 km from Phillaur, 27.8 km from district headquarter Jalandhar and 136 km from state capital Chandigarh. The village is administrated by a sarpanch who is an elected representative of village as per Panchayati raj (India).

== Transport ==
Nurmahal railway station is the nearest train station; however, Goraya Junction train station is 20 km away from the village. The village is 53.4 km away from domestic airport in Ludhiana and the nearest international airport is located in Chandigarh also Sri Guru Ram Dass Jee International Airport is the second nearest airport which is 120 km away in Amritsar.
