= Saidowal =

- Village
- Country: India
- State: Punjab
- District: Jalandhar

Languages
  - Official: Punjabi
- Time zone: UTC+5:30 (IST)
- PIN: 144039
- Telephone code: 1826
- Vehicle registration: PB- 08

Saidowal lies on the Phillaur-Nurmahal Road. The nearest main road to Saidowal is Phillaur-Nurmahal road which is almost 2 km from the village. The nearest Railway station to this village is Gumtali Railway station about 4 km from the village.saidowal

== About ==
Saidowal lies on the Phillaur–Nurmahal Road. The nearest main road to Saidowal is Phillaur–Nurmahal road which is almost 2 km from the village. The nearest railway station to this village is Gumtali Railway Station about 4 km from the village.
