= Gurdas Ram Alam =

Punjabi language poet

- Alam at Derby England 1972
- Born: 1912; Bundala, Jalandhar, Punjab, British India
- Died: 1989 (aged 76–77)
- Occupations: Poet, Bhatta Mazdoor
- Writing career
- Period: 1937–1973
- Subjects: Inequality, revolution, social change
- Notable work: Alam Kav (1965)
- Movement: Progressive poetry

Gurdas Ram Alam (1912–1989), was a Punjabi language poet born in Bundala village of Jalandhar, Punjab. He was a progressive and activist poet from a marginalized part of the society known as Dalits, and he is known as the first Punjabi Dalit poet. He was from a working-class family and lived in a small mud house in a village. Alam did not go to school, he learned reading and writing Gurmukhi from his friends. Being a working-class child, he started working at a very young age, and also started writing poems from his childhood. His first source of inspiration for getting into writing was oppression by the rich on the poor people that he experienced while working as a child laborer. Despite being illiterate, he emerged as a popular name in Punjabi folk poetry before the partition of India. Alam is recognised as a Dalit activist poet and the voice of deprived, and oppressed castes and communities.

== Life and work ==
Gurdas Ram Alam was born in Bundala village of Jalandhar, Punjab. His mother's name was Jioni and father's name, Shri Ram. Alam worked as bhatta majdoor and construction worker from a very young age. His work as a child labourer became his inspiration for writing poems which became his way of expression of how he felt being a working-class boy. He remained uneducated because his family could not support sending him to school.

== Writing ==
=== Style and influence ===
He was contemporary of Shiv Kumar Batalvi, Avtar Singh Paash, Amrita Pritam and Prof. Mohan Singh. He had one friend from the village, the Marxist leader Harkishan Singh Surjeet, and became influenced by Marxism and Naxalite Movement. He had been jailed a few times. People called him a communist because his poetry was direct Punjabi expression of marxist philoshopy. Later Sant Ram Udasi and Lal Singh Dil followed the same creed and emerged as descendants Alam, their work served as inspiration for Naxalite movement of Punjab in 1960's. He was very close to some old Punjabi poets like Nand Lal Noorpuri, Vidhata Singh Teer and Firoz Din Sharaf.

As a poet of Dalit-consciousness he was also inspired by the thought and philosophy of B. R. Ambedkar. He wrote a poem "Bada shor painda gareeban de vehre" which recited in Ambedkar's presence during a public meeting in 1959 at Bootan Mandi Jalandhar, Punjab.
