= Sidham Hari Singh =

Sidhu Hari Singh
- Village
- Location in Punjab, India Sidhu Hari Singh (India)
- Coordinates: 31.1119788°N 75.6284397°E
- Country: India
- State: Punjab
- District: Jalandhar

Government
  - Type: Panchayat raj
  - Body: Gram panchayat
- Elevation: 240 m (790 ft)

Population (2011)
  - Total: 545
- Sex ratio 265/280 ♂/♀

Languages
  - Official: Punjabi
- Time zone: UTC+5:30 (IST)
- PIN: 144034
- ISO 3166 code: IN-PB
- Vehicle registration: PB- 08
- Website: jalandhar.nic.in

Sidhu Hari Singh is a village in the Jalandhar district of Punjab State, India. It is located 6.8 km from Nurmahal, 24.3 km from Phillaur, 30.5 km from the district headquarters Jalandhar and 136 km from state capital Chandigarh. The village is administrated by a sarpanch who is an elected representative of the village as per Panchayati raj.

== Transport ==
Nurmahal Railway Station is the nearest train station; however, Phillaur Junction train station is 23.7 km away from the village. The village is 53.7 km away from the domestic airport in Ludhiana and the nearest international airport is located in Chandigarh. Sri Guru Ram Dass Jee International Airport is the second nearest airport which is 123 km away in Amritsar.
