= Hampstead School =

Location
- Westbere Road; London, NW2 3RT; United Kingdom; 51.55577°N 0.20711°W

Information
- Type: Community school
- Motto: Learning together, achieving together
- Established: 1862
- Local authority: Camden
- Department for Education URN: 100052 Tables
- Ofsted: Reports
- Headmaster: Matthew Sadler
- Gender: Co-educational
- Age: 11 to 19
- Enrolment: 1,300
- Colours: Red, black and white
- Website: www.hampsteadschool.org.uk

Hampstead School is a large comprehensive school in the London Borough of Camden, located in West Hampstead in North London.

About 1,300 students between the ages of 11 and 19 attend its lower school and sixth form college. Hampstead School's headmaster since 2020 is Matt Sadler.

== History ==
The main school building on Westbere Road is one of West Hampstead's oldest buildings. It was originally the site of Haberdashers' Aske's Hampstead School after relocating from its original Hoxton premises in January 1903 and before moving in 1961 to its present location when it became Haberdashers' Aske's Boys' School, Elstree.

Hampstead School was founded as a secondary modern in 1961 and incorporated Harben Secondary Modern School in Netherwood Street, Kilburn, before becoming a comprehensive.

The main building façade still displays the old Latin motto Is est emendo; tendo quod macula iocus notitia – (in English) To correct faults, give direction and impart knowledge.

== Academic standards ==
Hampstead School was awarded a 'gold star' accolade by Ofsted in 2001, which placed it within the top 6% of schools in the country. This was despite half of its 1,275 pupils speaking English as a second language and 10 per cent being refugees. Compared with similar schools, Hampstead was rated well above average for exam results and given an 'A' grade.

Some aspects of the school's performance according to Ofsted dipped after the 2005 inspection. In particular, attendance and GCSE results fell sharply in 2006. However, according to Ofsted this dip was corrected by 2008.

GCSE students sitting their examinations in 2010 achieved the school's highest key stage 4 results to date, surpassing the record set by the 2009 cohort.

The 2012 Ofsted report graded the school as 'good' for both achievement of pupils and quality of teaching.

== Sixth Form ==
Hampstead School's approach, many of whose students enter the Sixth Form with below average standards, enables most go on to university.

=== Debating ===
The school's Debating Society meets every Friday and includes students from all year groups.

In 2005, 21 students from Hampstead School became the first team from a comprehensive school to win top prize for being best delegation at the Model United Nations (MUN) forum held at Belfast. Providing participants with the opportunity to debate issues of international concern, the MUN Forum was attended by over 250 delegates from 20 selected schools throughout England, Canada, Burkina Faso and America. Hampstead School students also received several awards for outstanding individual performances.

Entering two teams to compete in the biennial competition hosted by Woodhouse College in North Finchley, one of Hampstead School's teams (representing North Korea) won the 2017 MUN Best Delegation Award.

=== The Hampstead Trash ===
In 2013 headmaster Jacques Szemalikowski reported to the police a pupil who had set up a website critical of Hampstead School.

=== School mural ===
In 2024, Old Hampsteadian street artist Pref inspired a new 17-metre-wide (56 ft) and 7-metre-tall (23 ft) artwork for the school's design and technology building. Welcoming its creation, headmaster Matt Sadler commented: "the previous, smaller, mural that was replaced had been in situ for 12 years, but I hope the new one will last even longer..."

== Notable former pupils ==
Alumni (Old Hampsteadians) include:

- Athian Akec, activist and writer, trustee of the Black Equity Organisation
- Magdalen Berns, vlogger
- Alex Bogdanovic, Great Britain tennis player
- Neil Brockdorff, professor of Biochemistry at Oxford University
- Pablo Bronstein, artist
- Doc Brown (Ben Bailey Smith), actor, rapper, brother of Zadie Smith
- Jon Carroll, chairman of Berkshire Music Trust
- Aslam Choudry, Mayor of Brent (2011/22) and Labour borough councillor
- Maya Jane Coles, DJ and electro-music producer
- Rowenna Davis, journalist and Labour borough councillor
- Sadie Frost, actress
- Bruno Heller, television producer (Gotham (TV series), Rome (TV series))
- Tobias Hill, novelist and poet
- Jervis Johnson, games designer
- Jasper Joffe, artist
- Adam Kidron, music producer
- Anita Klein, printmaker
- Deborah Levy, novelist, poet and playwright
- Andrew McIntosh, Baron McIntosh of Haringey, former GLC Leader, government minister and member of the House of Lords
- Pref, graffiti artist and muralist
- Zia Haider Rahman, author
- Justin Rowlatt, TV journalist and presenter
- Zadie Smith, novelist
- Mark Stein, QPR and Chelsea footballer
- Helen Storey, professor, artist and fashion designer
- Aryan Tajbakhsh, English and Barawa footballer
- Amelia Toomey (aka Girli), singer, songwriter and rapper
- Jamie Waylett, former child actor as "Vincent Crabbe" in Harry Potter
- Rachel Yankey, British Olympian and England footballer.

== Notable teachers ==
In the 1998 New Year Honours, then-headmistress Tamsyn Imison was appointed DBE: citing that Dame Tamsyn Imison had introduced initiatives to improve standards and ensured the best were spread to local schools.
