= Machhiana =

- Village
- Location in Punjab, India Machhiana (India)
- Coordinates: 31.199966°N 75.6214664°E
- Country: India
- State: Punjab
- District: Jalandhar

Government
  - Type: Panchayat raj
  - Body: Gram panchayat
- Elevation: 240 m (790 ft)

Population (2011)
  - Total: 207
- Sex ratio 105/102 ♂/♀

Languages
  - Official: Punjabi
- Time zone: UTC+5:30 (IST)
- PIN: 144036
- ISO 3166 code: IN-PB
- Vehicle registration: PB- 08
- Website: jalandhar.nic.in

Machhiana is a village in Jalandhar district of Punjab State, India. It is located 14.5 km away from Nurmahal, 17.4 km from Nurmahal, 17.6 km from district headquarter Jalandhar and 145 km from state capital Chandigarh. The village is administrated by a sarpanch who is an elected representative of village as per Panchayati raj (India).

== Demography ==
According to the report published by Census India in 2011, Machhiana has a total number of 37 houses and population of 207 of which include 105 males and 102 females. Literacy rate of Machhiana is 84.78%, higher than state average of 75.84%. The population of children under the age of 6 years is 23 which is 11.11% of total population of Machhiana, and child sex ratio is approximately 917 higher than state average of 846.

Most of the people are from Schedule Caste which constitutes 18.84% of total population in Machhiana. The town does not have any Schedule Tribe population so far.

As per census 2011, 59 people were engaged in work activities out of the total population of Machhiana which includes 54 males and 5 females. According to census survey report 2011, 98.31% workers describe their work as main work and 1.69% workers are involved in marginal activity providing livelihood for less than 6 months.

== Transport ==
Chiheru railway station is the nearest train station however, Phagwara Junction train station is 17.6 km away from the village. The village is 66.1 km away from domestic airport in Ludhiana and the nearest international airport is located in Chandigarh also Sri Guru Ram Dass Jee International Airport is the second nearest airport which is 113 km away in Amritsar.
