= Gursian Piran =

- Village
- Location in Punjab, India Gursian Piran (India)
- Coordinates: 31.0223428°N 75.5403721°E
- Country: India
- State: Punjab
- District: Jalandhar

Government
  - Type: Panchayat raj
  - Body: Gram panchayat
- Elevation: 240 m (790 ft)

Population (2011)
  - Total: 1,000
- Sex ratio 545/455 ♂/♀

Languages
  - Official: Punjabi
- Time zone: UTC+5:30 (IST)
- PIN: 144039
- Telephone: 01821
- ISO 3166 code: IN-PB
- Vehicle registration: PB- 08
- Website: jalandhar.nic.in

Gursian Piran is a village in Jalandhar district of Punjab State, India. It is located 11 km away from Nurmahal, 28.5 km from Phillaur, 40 km from district headquarter Jalandhar and 138 km from state capital Chandigarh. The village is administrated by a sarpanch who is an elected representative of village as per Panchayati raj (India).

== Demography ==
According to the report published by Census India in 2011, Gursian Piran has a total number of 196 houses and population of 1000 of which include 545 males and 455 females. Literacy rate of Gursian Piran is 73.46%, lower than state average of 75.84%. The population of children under the age of 6 years is 92 which is 9.20% of total population of Gursian Piran, and child sex ratio is approximately 614 lower than state average of 897.

Most of the people are from the Schedule Caste which constitutes 61.70% of total population in Gursian Piran. The town does not have any Schedule Tribe population so far.

As per census 2011, 388 people were engaged in work activities out of the total population of Gursian Piran which includes 330 males and 58 females. According to census survey report 2011, 84.79% workers describe their work as main work and 15.21% workers are involved in marginal activity providing livelihood for less than 6 months.

== Transport ==
Nurmahal railway station is the nearest train station; however, Phagwara Junction train station is 27.9 km away from the village. The village is 58.8 km away from domestic airport in Ludhiana and the nearest international airport is located in Chandigarh also Sri Guru Ram Dass Jee International Airport is the second nearest airport which is 135 km away in Amritsar.
