= Justin Rowlatt =

British journalist

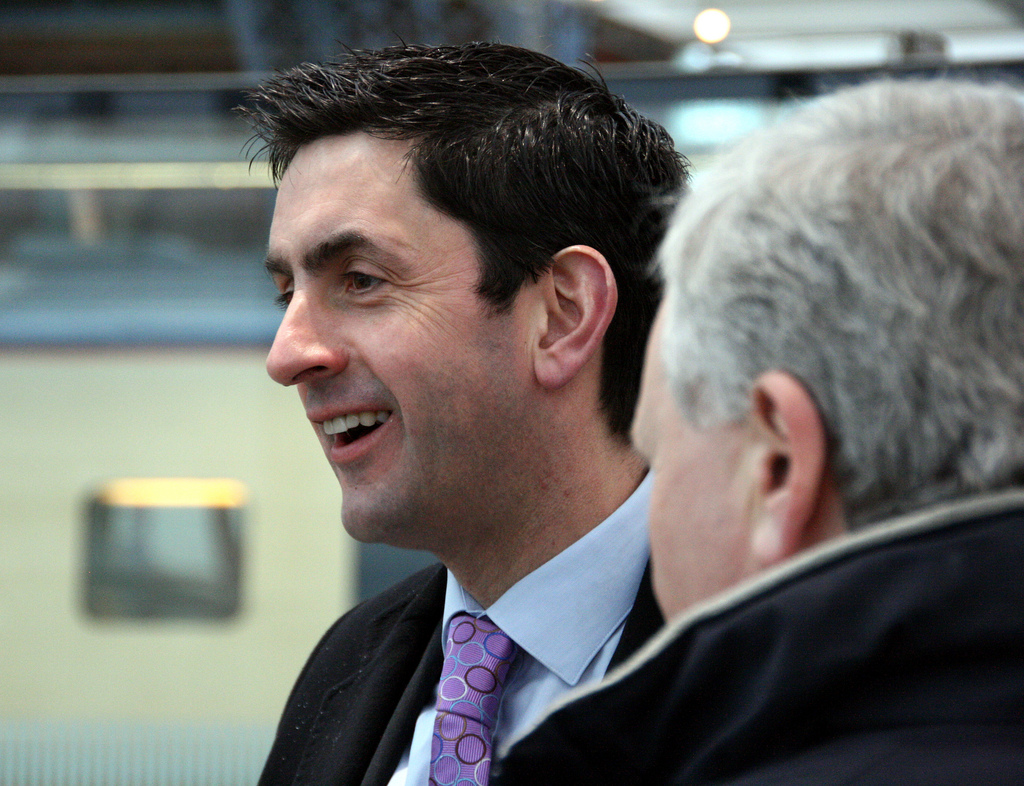
- Born: June 1966 (age 60); London, England
- Education: Hampstead Comprehensive
- Alma mater: Mansfield College, Oxford
- Occupations: Journalist, presenter
- Notable credit: Business Daily
- Spouse: Bee Rowlatt
- Children: 4
- Relatives: Sir Sidney Rowlatt (great‑grandfather)

Justin Rowlatt (born June 1966) is a British journalist, news reporter and television presenter who is currently working as Climate Editor for BBC News. He has previously been the BBC's South Asia Correspondent, based in Delhi and also its chief environment correspondent.

== Education ==
Justin Rowlatt was born in June 1966 in London. He went to school at Hampstead Comprehensive in Cricklewood, and later graduated in philosophy, politics and economics from Mansfield College, Oxford in 1987.

== Career ==
Rowlatt has been a correspondent on Newsnight, Channel 4 News and Panorama and has been nominated for Royal Television Society and BAFTA awards for his work.

=== Early career ===
One of Rowlatt's first jobs in television was as an assistant producer on current affairs documentary Panorama, where, among many other stories, he worked on a programme which showed how Mercedes, Volkswagen and Volvo car dealers were fixing prices in Britain.

During his time on Channel 4 News, he was a passenger on the train involved in the Hatfield rail crash in 2000, reporting that he "watched the carriages skid and whip around on the gravel besides the track".

=== Ethical Man ===
Rowlatt became widely known in Britain when in 2006 he became Newsnight's "Ethical Man". On Rowlatt's first day at the programme, Peter Barron, the editor, challenged him and his family to spend a year trying to reduce their impact on the environment. It made him an "accidental green hero", according to The Guardian. In 2003, that paper had commissioned Leo Hickman to spend a year with his young family on a similar project, which resulted in a book entitled Life Stripped Bare: My Year Trying To Live Ethically. Rowlatt, who acknowledges his debt to Hickman (and to Lucy Siegle, author of Green Living in the Urban Jungle), continued in this vein, focusing on environmental impact, especially his carbon footprint (rather than, say, labour rights).

The strand featured Rowlatt reporting on global warming and environment issues across all BBC outlets. Panorama broadcast an Ethical Man special "Go Green or Else". In 2007, Rowlatt presented an hour-long prime-time programme exploring how the United States is engaging with the climate issue for BBC Two's This World, titled "Can Obama Save the Planet?".

=== Later career ===
Much of Rowlatt's career has focussed on current affairs and business and economic reporting. He was part of the original reporting team for BBC One's prime time factual programme, The One Show, "reporting on current affairs with flair". He was a relief presenter for BBC Breakfast in 2010 and for BBC Radio 4's PM programme in 2014. During his time as a Newsnight correspondent he caused a minor scandal when the President of Ukraine, Viktor Yanukovych, complained about his dress sense.

As the host of the World Service's occasional series Exchanges on the World Economy, Rowlatt has interviewed some of the most high-profile economists in the world, including Joseph Stiglitz and Nassim Taleb. He was the main presenter on the World Service's flagship business programme, Business Daily. He presented the Radio 4 popular science/economics strand "The Elements", which explored the role of the chemical elements in the world economy, and co-presented two series of the BBC Two personal finance programmes MoneyWatch. He presented the Business section of the Today Programme.

In 2008, Rowlatt became the first television journalist to interview a serving MI6 agent; the intelligence service was seeking to broaden its recruitment. Rowlatt says of his interviewing technique, "It wasn’t like a Paxman interview but I was trying to get under his skin a bit and understand what it was like to do his job." Under the hot camera lights, the agent's false moustache slipped from his lip. His technique evidently annoyed Sir Alan Sugar, the entrepreneur at the centre of The Apprentice. In a 2014 interview, Rowlatt asked him about alleged bullying; Sugar objected, accused him of "gutter journalism", and walked out.

Rowlatt has presented prime time television series including The Trouble with Working Women with Sophie Raworth. The May 2009 programme caused controversy when at management consultancy Accenture he suggested a female-heavy office must have been full of secretaries. In 2011, he presented The Chinese Are Coming, a pair of documentaries looking at the growing influence of China in Africa and in the Americas.

Also in 2011, he co-presented, with fellow journalist Anita Rani, the two-part documentary travelogue India on Four Wheels, a road trip around India sampling the changes and problems the growing car usage has brought to the country in the last two decades. The format proved successful, and the pair collaborated on two two-part follow-ups, first China on Four Wheels, which aired in September 2012, and then Russia on Four Wheels, which aired in January 2014. Rowlatt and Rani had a "jokey, human interest, quick-in-and-out approach"

Rowlatt reports regularly for From Our Own Correspondent. His dispatches have included reflections on his experiences with the Awa tribe in the Amazon, the time he discussed gay rights while taking a sauna with two homophobic Russians, and what India's space scientists and street children have in common.

Rowlatt was a foreign correspondent, as the BBC's lead reporter for the entire South Asia region. He took up the post in Delhi for two years, starting February 2015. One of his first assignments was the April 2015 Nepal earthquake. That summer he went undercover to Thalsevana, a holiday resort taken over by the Sri Lankan military during the civil war.

In 2019 he has been chief environment correspondent at the BBC. The BBC appointed Rowlatt as climate editor in September 2021.

== Personal life ==
Rowlatt is married to writer and former BBC World Service producer Bee Rowlatt and they have four children. The family appeared in the year-long filming of Ethical Man, and "Ethical Wife" contributed independently to the series by investigating his oil company holdings. She has written of their relationship and family life in her book Talking About Jane Austen in Baghdad. The couple jointly presented the 2013 documentary Make Me a German.

Rowlatt's paternal great-grandfather was the judge Sir Sidney Rowlatt who headed the Rowlatt Committee in British India.

Rowlatt was a passenger on the train that derailed and crashed at Hatfield on 17 October 2000.
