= Rupowal =

- Village
- Location in Punjab, India Rupowal (India)
- Coordinates: 31.0865834°N 75.6969679°E
- Country: India
- State: Punjab
- District: Jalandhar

Government
  - Type: Panchayat raj
  - Body: Gram panchayat
- Elevation: 240 m (790 ft)

Population (2011)
  - Total: 997
- Sex ratio 506/491 ♂/♀

Languages
  - Official: Punjabi
- Time zone: UTC+5:30 (IST)
- PIN: 144037
- ISO 3166 code: IN-PB
- Website: jalandhar.nic.in

Rupowal is a village in Jalandhar district of Punjab State, India. It is located 5.2 km from Rurka Kalan, 15 km from Phillaur, 41 km from district headquarter Jalandhar and 126 km from state capital Chandigarh. The village is administrated by a sarpanch who is an elected representative of village as per Panchayati raj (India).

== Transport ==
Bilga railway station is the nearest train station; however, Phillaur Junction train station is 14.5 km away from the village. The village is 44.3 km away from domestic airport in Ludhiana and the nearest international airport is located in Chandigarh also Sri Guru Ram Dass Jee International Airport is the second nearest airport which is 137 km away in Amritsar.
