= Uppal Bhupa =

- Village
- Location in Punjab, India Uppal Bhupa (India)
- Coordinates: 31.0447648°N 75.6268814°E
- Country: India
- State: Punjab
- District: Jalandhar

Government
  - Type: Panchayat raj
  - Body: Gram panchayat
- Elevation: 240 m (790 ft)

Population (2011)
  - Total: 1,035
- Sex ratio 506/529 ♂/♀

Languages
  - Official: Punjabi
- Time zone: UTC+5:30 (IST)
- PIN: 144039
- Telephone: 01821
- ISO 3166 code: IN-PB
- Vehicle registration: PB- 08
- Posta office: Nurmahal
- Website: jalandhar.nic.in

Uppal Bhupa is a village in Jalandhar district of Punjab State, India. It is located 8.8 km from postal head office in Nurmahal, 19.3 km from Phillaur, 37.3 km from district headquarter Jalandhar and 140 km from state capital Chandigarh. The village is administrated by a sarpanch, who is an elected representative.

== Demography ==
As of 2011, the village had a total number of 227 houses and population of 1035 of which comprised 506 males and 529 females according to the report published by Census India the Literacy rate was 81.24%, higher than state average of 75.84%. The population of children under the age of 6 years was 97 which was 9.37% of total population, and child sex ratio was approximately 1205 higher than the state average of 846.

Most of the people are from Schedule Caste which constitutes 55.7% of total population in the village. The town does not have any Schedule Tribe population so far.

As per census 2011, 280 people were engaged in work activities out of the total population of the village which includes 271 males and 9 females. According to census survey report 2011, 100% workers describe their work as main work and 0% workers are involved in marginal activity providing livelihood for less than 6 months.

== Transport ==
Nurmahal railway station is the nearest train station however, Phillaur Junction train station is 18.7 km away from the village. The village is 47.8 km away from domestic airport in Ludhiana and the nearest international airport is located in Chandigarh also Sri Guru Ram Dass Jee International Airport is the second nearest airport which is 130 km away in Amritsar.
