= Pandori Musharkati =

- Village
- Location in Punjab, India Pandori Musharkati (India)
- Coordinates: 31.1628165°N 75.6425214°E
- Country: India
- State: Punjab
- District: Jalandhar

Government
  - Type: Panchayat raj
  - Body: Gram panchayat
- Elevation: 240 m (790 ft)

Population (2011)
  - Total: 1,543
- Sex ratio 776/767 ♂/♀

Languages
  - Official: Punjabi
- Time zone: UTC+5:30 (IST)
- PIN: 144043
- ISO 3166 code: IN-PB
- Vehicle registration: PB- 08
- Website: jalandhar.nic.in

Pandori Musharkati is a village in Jalandhar district of Punjab State, India. It is located 17.9 km from Nakodar, 29 km from Phillaur, 22 km from district headquarter Jalandhar and 139 km from state capital Chandigarh. The village is administrated by a sarpanch who is an elected representative of village as per Panchayati raj (India).

== Transport ==
Nurmahal railway station is the nearest train station; however, Phagwara Junction train station is 17 km away from the village. The village is 57 km away from domestic airport in Ludhiana and the nearest international airport is located in Chandigarh also Sri Guru Ram Dass Jee International Airport is the second nearest airport which is 114 km away in Amritsar.
