= Kandola Khurd =

- Village
- Location in Punjab, India Kandola Khurd (India)
- Coordinates: 31.079723°N 75.6702803°E
- Country: India
- State: Punjab
- District: Jalandhar

Government
  - Type: Panchayat raj
  - Body: Gram panchayat
- Elevation: 240 m (790 ft)

Population (2011)
  - Total: 904
- Sex ratio 460/444 ♂/♀

Languages
  - Official: Punjabi
- Time zone: UTC+5:30 (IST)
- PIN: 144037
- Telephone: 01826
- ISO 3166 code: IN-PB
- Vehicle registration: PB- 08
- Post office: Pasla
- Website: jalandhar.nic.in

Kandola Khurd is a village in Jalandhar district of Punjab State, India. It is located 10.4 km away from Nurmahal, 14 km from Phillaur, 35.4 km from district headquarter Jalandhar and 124 km from state capital Chandigarh. The village is administrated by a sarpanch, who is an elected representative.

== Demography ==
According to the report published by Census India in 2011, Kandola Khurd has a total number of 179 houses and population of 904 of which include 460 males and 444 females. Literacy rate of Kandola Khurd is 75.27%, lower than state average of 75.84%. The population of children under the age of 6 years is 83 which is 9.18% of total population of Kandola Khurd, and child sex ratio is approximately 965 higher than state average of 846.

Most of the people are from Schedule Caste which constitutes 55.9% of total population in Kandola Khurd. The town does not have any Schedule Tribe population so far.

As per census 2011, 297 people were engaged in work activities out of the total population of Kandola Khurd which includes 269 males and 28 females. According to census survey report 2011, 90.24% workers describe their work as main work and 9.76% workers are involved in marginal activity providing livelihood for less than 6 months.

== Transport ==
Nurmahal railway station is the nearest train station; however, Phillaur Junction train station is 13.5 km away from the village. The village is 43.8 km away from domestic airport in Ludhiana and the nearest international airport is located in Chandigarh also Sri Guru Ram Dass Jee International Airport is the second nearest airport which is 129 km away in Amritsar.
