= Gumtali =

Coordinates: 31°04′N 75°38′E

- Village
- Interactive map of Gumtali
- Country: India
- State: Punjab
- District: Jalandhar

Languages
  - Official: Punjabi
- Time zone: UTC+5:30 (IST)
- PIN: 144039
- Telephone code: 1826

Gumtali is a village in Nurmahal. Nurmahal is a sub tehsil in the city Jalandhar of Indian state of Punjab.

== About ==
Gumtali lies on the Phillaur-Nurmahal Road. The nearest main road to Gumtali is Phillaur-Nurmahal road which is almost 2 km from the village. The nearest Railway station to this village is Gumtali Railway station.
