= Magdalen Berns =

British YouTuber and campaigner (1983–2019)

- Born: 6 May 1983; London, England
- Died: 13 September 2019 (aged 36); Marie Curie Hospice, Edinburgh, Scotland
- Education: Hampstead School; University of Edinburgh
- Occupations: Software developer; vlogger; campaigner; boxing coach

YouTube information
- Channel: Magdalen Berns
- Subscribers: 43.6K
- Views: 5.24M
- Last updated: 26 March 2025

Magdalen Berns (6 May 1983 – 13 September 2019) was a British YouTuber. Berns, a lesbian radical feminist, became known for her series of YouTube vlogs in the late 2010s concerning topics such as women's rights and gender identity. She co-founded the non-profit organisation For Women Scotland, which campaigns against possible changes to the Gender Recognition Act 2004, among other things. Berns has been described as a TERF, due to the anti-transgender content of her vlogs.

== Early life, education, and career ==
Berns was born in London to Eileen Maurice "Deborah" Lavin, who helped found the Communist Party of Great Britain (Marxist–Leninist), and Argentine-born Gustavo Berns. Her parents separated after her birth and she was raised in New Cross in the London Borough of Lewisham. In the 1990s, the family relocated to a council flat in Hampstead in the London Borough of Camden, where Berns attended Hampstead School. As a teenager, Berns participated in activism, including campaigning against Huntingdon Life Sciences, attending discussion meetings of, and distributing election leaflets for, the Socialist Labour Party, and, according to the Morning Star newspaper, protesting against a fur shop in Piccadilly.

After leaving Hampstead School, Berns worked as a sound engineer until attending the University of Edinburgh in her thirties. She initially studied engineering, receiving a Doris Gray Scholarship — an award for underprivileged women studying engineering in Scotland — from the Women's Engineering Society. In her second year, she switched to physics, graduating in 2016. She was a self-taught computer programmer, and between 2013 and 2015, she participated in the Google Summer of Code project, working on implementing the FFTW3 library for Ruby. As part of the Summer of Code, she interned in the Outreach Program for Women of the GNOME Foundation, where she worked on the Java ATK Wrapper, a module to translate Swing events for the Accessibility Toolkit, and on implementing a caret and focus tracking device in GNOME Shell.

== Boxing career ==
Berns was active in Scottish amateur boxing. From 2009 to 2011, she was a member of the Edinburgh-based Leith Victoria amateur boxing club. In 2009, she competed in the Scottish University Boxing Championships in the bantamweight division, losing in the final to Sinead Sheehan. In 2010, she became the first Scottish boxer to win at the Haringey Box Cup. In 2011, Berns was a member of Scotland's first female boxing squad. That year, she became the first Scottish boxer to win at the Golden Girl Championship; won the British Universities and Colleges Sport (BUCS) Boxing Championship in the novice women's 54 kg class; and competed in the Scottish Amateur Boxing Championships in the 51 kg (flyweight) category, losing in the senior finals to Stephanie Kernachan. In the same year, she was one of four female boxers to spar with undefeated male bantamweight boxer Dave Cowan to help him prepare for an upcoming bout. In 2012, Berns joined the Holyrood amateur boxing club. That year, she again represented Scotland in the Golden Girl Championship. Berns went on to serve as a boxing coach for the University of Edinburgh.

She was posthumously described by Boxing Scotland as "a pioneer for both women's boxing and university boxing in Scotland".

== Views and activism ==
In 2015, Berns expressed opposition to the Edinburgh University Students' Association "LGBT Liberation" group's issuing a statement of support for the decision to exclude drag acts from participating in that year's Pride Glasgow event. In 2016, Berns was banned from the University of Edinburgh's Feminist Society for opposing the decriminalisation of prostitution.

In April 2016, Berns began her series of "irreverent" and "caustic" YouTube vlogs where she published her views on gender identity. She also argued against gender self-identification. Speaking on the subject of sex, gender, and sexuality, Berns stated: "You don't get 'assigned' reproductive organs ... males are defined by their biological sex organs. Likewise, homosexuals are people who are attracted to the same biological sex." She categorised lesbians as "women who are same-sex attracted". She described trans women as "blackface actors", and stated, "Trans women are men", that "there is no such thing as a lesbian with a penis", and that she would "rather be rude than a fucking liar". She described trans activism as a "men's rights movement". She was also critical of the LGBT rights charity Stonewall.

In May 2016, Berns was among the signatories of an open letter to the Morning Star newspaper that lauded it for "giving a platform for a sex-class based analysis of women's position, in the face of the convergence of neoliberal individualism and alienation from class consciousness". In July 2016, Berns spoke at Thinking Differently: Feminists Questioning Gender Politics, a conference in London focusing on "the implications of transgenderism for women's rights". Berns addressed her experiences with no platforming as a university student. In 2017, Berns appeared at an event in Conway Hall headlined by Julie Bindel.

In 2018, Berns co-founded the Scottish campaign group For Women Scotland. The group, which opposes reform of the Gender Recognition Act 2004, and lobbies on other matters such as toilet provision in schools, has been called anti-trans, which the group itself disputes. In April 2018, Berns was among the signatories of an open letter to The Times opposing the admission of transgender girls into the Girl Guides.

In June 2019, British author J. K. Rowling was criticised for bringing more visibility to Berns by following her on Twitter. By the autumn of 2019, Berns's vlogs had amassed approximately 30,000 followers. In June 2020, Rowling revealed that she had spoken with Berns, describing her as "an immensely brave young feminist and lesbian", and had begun receiving "low-level harassment" as a result of her association with Berns. Berns was posthumously described by Rowling as "a great believer in the importance of biological sex [who] didn't believe lesbians should be called bigots for not dating trans women with penises."

=== Reactions ===
Berns's opinions attracted both criticism and acclaim. She was described as "one of the most hateful and aggressive anti-trans radical feminists on Twitter" by blogger Phaylen Fairchild; as a "TERF" (trans-exclusionary radical feminist) by Vice writer Lewis Gordon; and as a "transphobe" in the Trans Advocate Twitter account, as well as "whorephobic" by members of the Edinburgh University Students' Association. Writing in student newspaper The Wesleyan Argus, Connor Aberle stated that Berns's "most popular uploads simply mock videos of transgender people", describing her as part of "a group of far-left YouTubers who hate transgender people". Writing in Femestella, Alysia Stevenson described Berns as "a prominent anti-trans Youtuber", accusing her of "hateful rhetoric". Writing in the New York Post, Melkorka Licea described Berns as "outspoken". Transgender rights activist and philosophy professor Veronica Ivy drew criticism—and a protest letter with over 500 signatories—after defending celebrations by Berns's opponents of her impending death. Ivy said such celebrations are "ethically justified when the person dying has engaged in extreme harassment of a marginalised group". Writing in The Social Review, Joaquina stated that Berns had suggested that "the 'trans agenda' is bankrolled by George Soros, a Jewish philanthropist" in an article concerning transphobia and antisemitism.

Writing in the Morning Star, Susan Chynoweth and Deborah Lavin (Berns' mother) praised Berns' "determined defence of women's sex-based rights and the rights of lesbians to assert their sexuality in the face of relentless demands to redefine sex as gender", and said she was "one of the best-known feminist speakers of her generation". National Review staff writer Madeleine Kearns called her videos a "great source of inspiration and clarity for those trying to resist gender extremism". Writing in The Velvet Chronicle, Julia Diana Robertson eulogised Berns as a "rare force of nature", suggesting that "while many may never know the impact she made, the ripple effect will be felt for many years to come". Journalist Meghan Murphy stated that Berns had contributed to "igniting public conversation around sex, gender, and sexuality". In Der Freitag, Berns was described as a "person who pits logical thinking, scientific definitions and dictionaries against ideological zeal and perceived reality", whose videos "will continue to help people navigate gender, feminism, and identity politics, inspire and hopefully lessen the confusion." The poet Jenny Lindsay described Berns as "a key figure in any discussion of the history of the UK gender wars [who] unapologetically skewered both gender identity activism and many of its adherents, taking particular aim at those who sought to redefine the word 'lesbian'." Irish comedy writer and anti-transgender activist Graham Linehan voiced vocal support for Berns on Twitter and other platforms. Berns's death was noted by two Members of the Scottish Parliament: Joan McAlpine MSP described her as a "clever and uncompromising" young woman, while Ruth Maguire MSP described her as a "courageous young feminist, who inspired others". The Communist Party of Great Britain (Marxist–Leninist) stated that Berns "gained a large online following for her own forthright brand of radical feminism". In October 2019, Berns was posthumously shortlisted for the Emma Humphreys Memorial Prize, which the organisation awards to women it deems to have "raised awareness of violence against women and children"; in November 2019, she received posthumously a special award from the organisation.

== Cancer and death ==
In April 2017, Berns informed her YouTube subscribers that she had been diagnosed with a brain tumour that was affecting her left frontal lobe, which she later clarified to be centred in her left parietal lobe. In July, she announced that she had an astrocytoma that could not be completely removed surgically. The tumour evolved into glioblastoma, with which she was diagnosed in October 2018.

Berns died from brain cancer on 13 September 2019, aged 36, in a Marie Curie Hospice in Edinburgh.
