= Kandola Kalan =

- Village
- Country: India
- State: Punjab
- District: Jalandhar

Languages
  - Official: Punjabi
- Time zone: UTC+5:30 (IST)
- PIN: 144039
- Telephone code: 1826
- Vehicle registration: PB- 08

Kandola Kalan is a village in Nurmahal. Nurmahal is a sub tehsil and tehsil is Phillaur in the city Jalandhar of Indian state of Punjab.

== About ==
Kandola Kalan is almost 1 km from Nurmahal. The nearest Railway station to Kandola Kalan is Nurmahal Railway station.

== Post code & STD code ==
Kandola Kalan's Post code and STD code are 144039 & 01826 respectively.
