= Ade Kali =

AdeKali
- Village
- Location in Punjab, India AdeKali (India)
- Coordinates: 31.118°N 75.637°E
- Country: India
- State: Punjab
- District: Jalandhar

Languages
  - Official: Punjabi
- Time zone: UTC+5:30 (IST)
- PIN: 144034
- Vehicle registration: PB- 08

Ade Kali is a village in Rurka Kalan. Jalandhar is a district of Indian state of Punjab.

== About ==
AdeKali lies on the Bundala-Nurmahal road at a distance of 1 km from it. The nearest railway station to Ade Kali is Nurmahal railway station at a distance of 6 km.

== Post code ==
AdeKali's Post office is Bundala whose post code is 144034.
