= Neil Brockdorff =

British biochemist (born 1958)

Neil Brockdorff FRS FMedSci FRSB
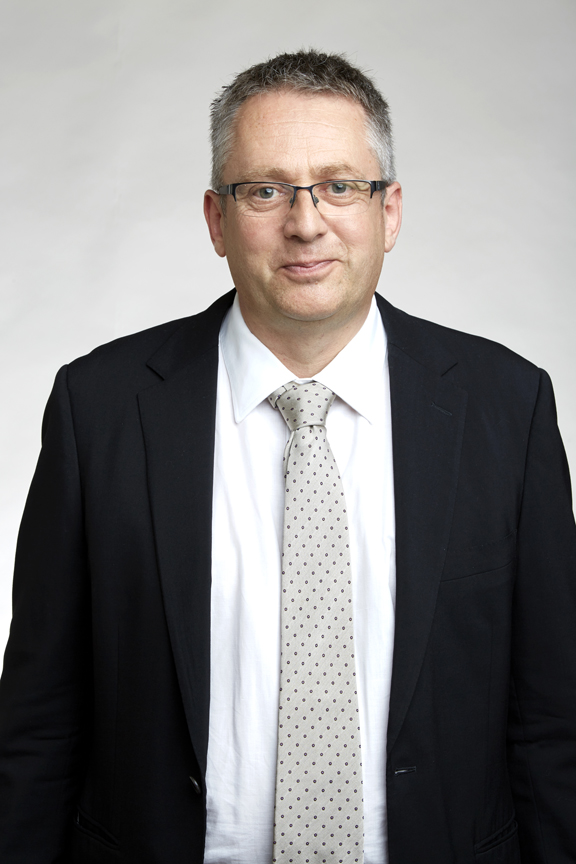
- Neil Brockdorff at the Royal Society in London, July 2018
- Born: Neil Alexander Steven Brockdorff; 1958 (age 67–68)
- Education: Hampstead School
- Alma mater: University of Sussex (BSc); University of Glasgow (PhD)
- Awards: EMBO Member (1999)
- Scientific career
- Fields: Developmental epigenetics X inactivation
- Institutions: University of Oxford
- Thesis: The effect of oestradiol-17β on the ribonucleases and ribonuclease inhibitor of immature rat uterus (1985)
- Website: www.bioch.ox.ac.uk/research/brockdorff

Neil Alexander Steven Brockdorff (born 1958) is a British biochemist who is a Wellcome Trust Principal Research Fellow and professor in the department of biochemistry at the University of Oxford. Brockdorff's research investigates gene and genome regulation in mammalian development. His interests are in the molecular basis of X-inactivation, the process that evolved in mammals to equalise X chromosome gene expression levels in XX females relative to XY males.

== Education ==
Brockdorff was educated at Hampstead School, the University of Sussex (BSc) and the University of Glasgow (PhD).

== Career and research ==
X inactivation is an important model for understanding how epigenetic mechanisms, for example modification of DNA and histone proteins around which DNA is packaged, contribute to gene regulation in developmental biology. In earlier work Brockdorff demonstrated that an unusual functional RNA molecule, XIST, controls the X inactivation process. Building on this finding he has elucidated key steps in XIST gene regulation during early development, and has defined major pathways through which XIST RNA induces chromosome wide gene silencing.

=== Awards and honours ===
Brockdorff is a member of the European Molecular Biology Organization (EMBO), a Fellow of the Royal Society (FRS), a Fellow of the Academy of Medical Sciences (FMedSci) and a Fellow of the Royal Society of Biology (FRSB).
