= Mao Sahib =

Mao Sahib ਮਾਓ ਸਾਹਿਬ
- Village
- Location in Punjab, India Mao Sahib (India)
- Coordinates: 31.0193472°N 75.6860428°E
- Country: India
- State: Punjab
- District: Jalandhar

Government
  - Type: Panchayat raj
  - Body: Gram panchayat
- Elevation: 240 m (790 ft)

Languages
  - Official: Punjabi
- Time zone: UTC+5:30 (IST)
- ISO 3166 code: IN-PB
- Website: jalandhar.nic.in

Mao Sahib (Punjabi: ਮਾਓ ਸਾਹਿਬ) is a village and the birthplace of Mata Ganga in Jalandhar district of Punjab State, India. It is located 10 km from Phillaur, 14 km from Nurmahal, 47 km from district headquarter Jalandhar and 120 km from state capital Chandigarh. The village is administrated by a sarpanch who is an elected representative of village as per Panchayati raj (India).

== Landmarks ==
Gurudwara Guru Arjan Dev Ji is one of a historical Sikh temple is situated in the village where fifth Sikh guru Guru Arjan Dev Ji married Mata Ganga. The gurdwara committee organises a fair annually in the memory of Guru Arjan Dev Ji's marriage which took place at the Gurudwara and runs for three days. People also celebrate festivals and fairs annually in Mao Sahib which have taken a semi-secular meaning and are regarded as cultural festivals by people of all religions.

== Transport ==
Partabpura railway station is the nearest train station; however, Phillaur Junction train station is 9.3 km away from the village. The village is 38.7 km away from domestic airport in Ludhiana and the nearest international airport is located in Chandigarh also Sri Guru Ram Dass Jee International Airport is the second nearest airport which is 148 km away in Amritsar.
