= Ramewal =

Village in Jalandhar district

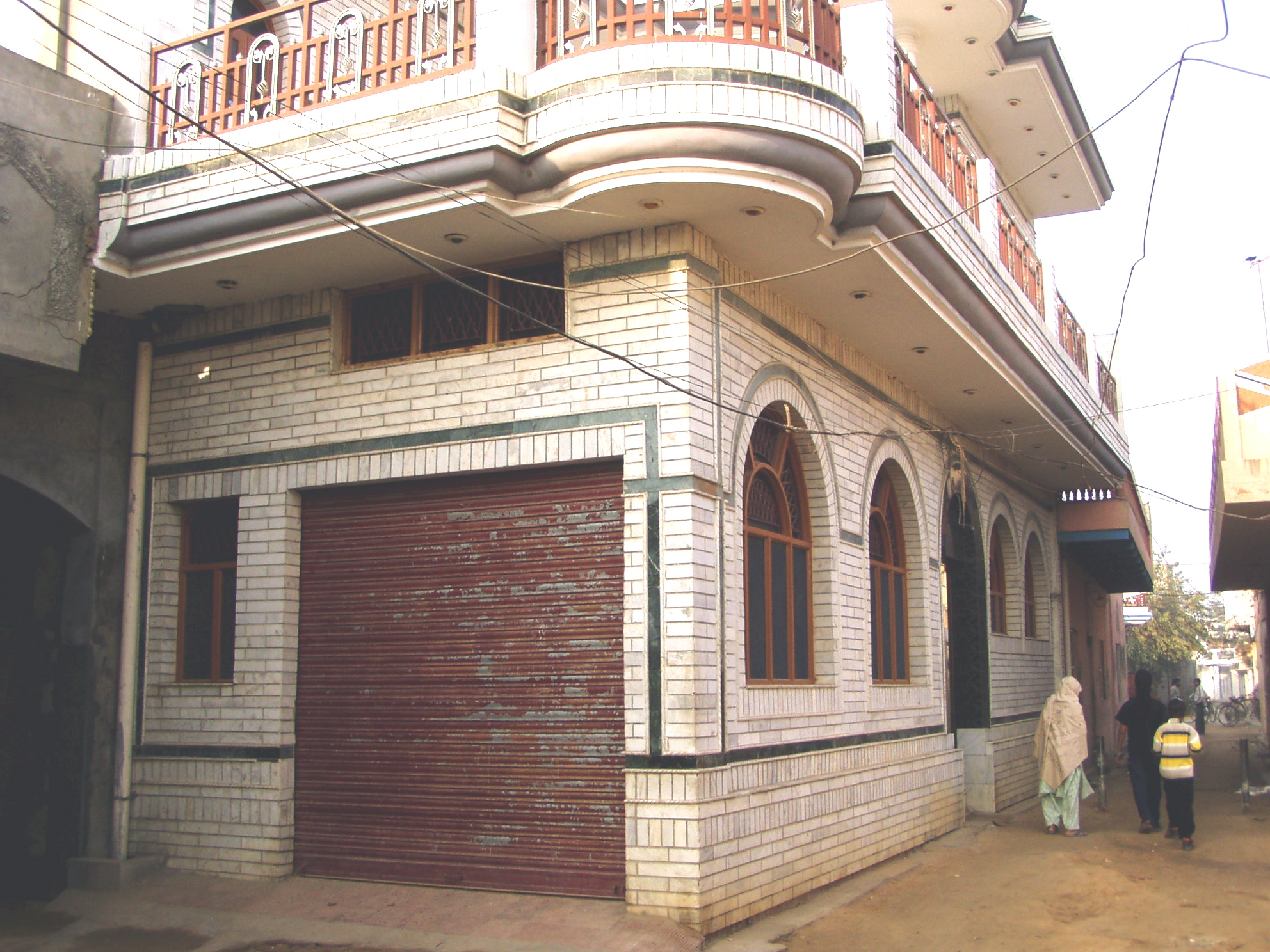

Village: Ramewal
| Coordinates | 31.0488°N 75.36°E |
| Occupiers | Chungh Clan |
| Sub-tehsil | Nurmahal |
| District | Jalandhar |
| State | Punjab |
| Area telephone | 1826 |
| Postal code | 144039 |
| Time zone | UTC+5:30 |

Ramewal (Punjabi: ਰਾਮੇਵਾਲ) is a village in Nurmahal. Nurmahal is a sub-tehsil in the Jalandhar District in the state of Punjab, India.

== About ==
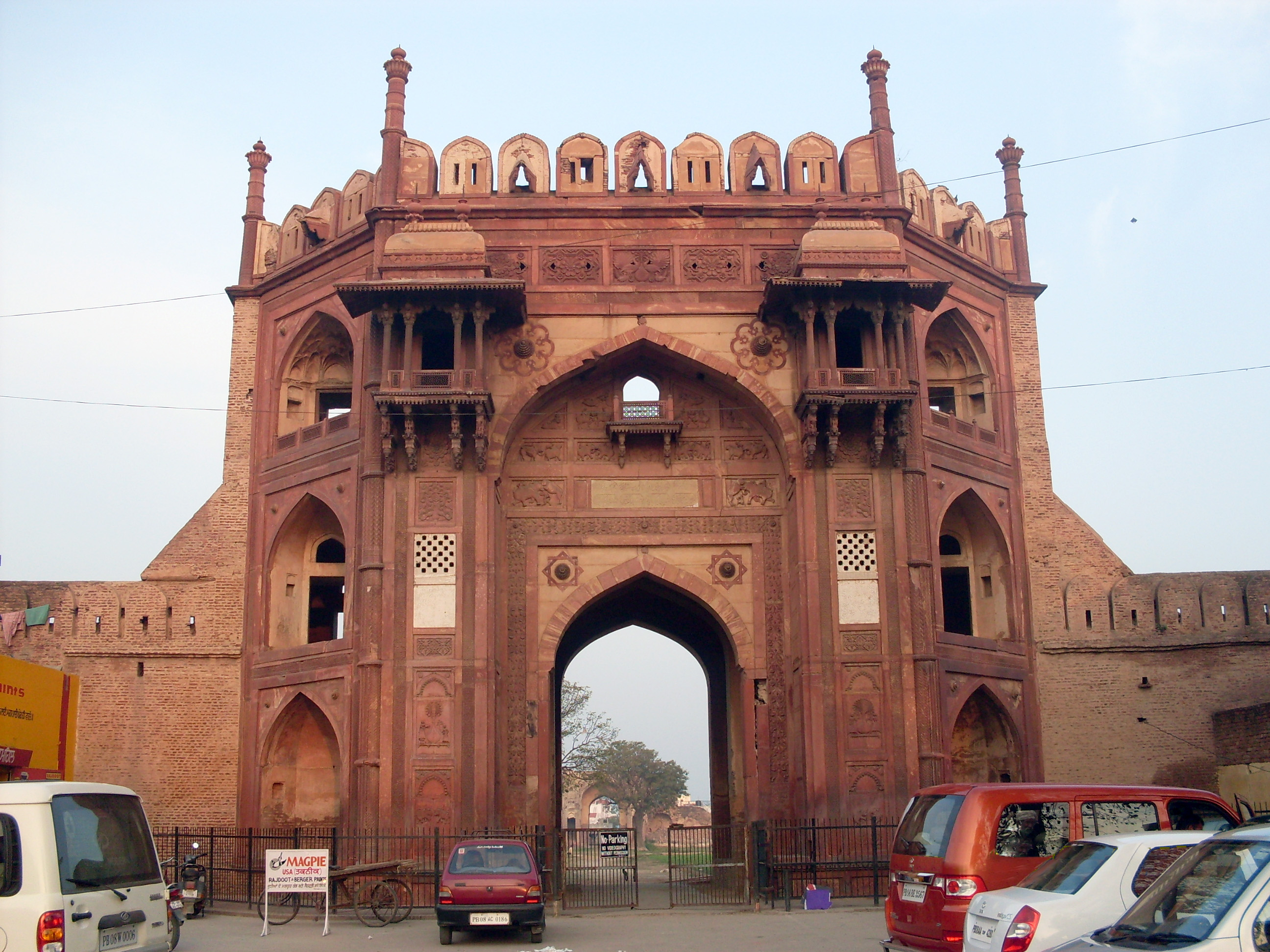
The Nurmahal Sarai

Ramewal village is almost 6 km from Nurmahal. The nearest railway station to Ramewal is Nurmahal railway station. Most of the occupiers of the village have the last name 'Choongh' or 'Waraich'.

== History of Nurmahal and Jalandhar ==
Nurmahal was built in a place where an ancient town called Kot Kahlur was located, proven by the bricks and many coins found beneath the soil of this town. It is believed that the ancient city was abandoned or destroyed around 1300 for an unknown reason. Maharaja Jassa Singh Ahluwalia took this city under his control.

Nurmahal is named after Noor Jahan, the wife of Mughal emperor Jahangir (1605–1627) as she was brought up here, and is thought to have spent her childhood here.

Jalandhar and Multan are the oldest surviving cities of the Punjab region, with historical references as far back as 100 AD.

== Immigration to the west ==
There are many people who reside in the village (pind) of Ramewal and it is respectably populated. Most of those from Ramewal have immigrated to the United Kingdom, United States and Canada.

== Religion ==
The main religion followed by the majority in Ramewal is Sikhism. The minority are followers of either Islam or Hinduism.

== Developments ==
Ramewal is a fast-growing village. There are a lot of developments planned for the village in the near future. Currently, for example the construction of the new gurudawara

== Post code and Std code ==
The post code and STD code for Ramewal village are 144039 and 01826, respectively.
