= India on Four Wheels =

- Country of origin: United Kingdom
- No. of episodes: 2

Original release
- Network: BBC Two
- Release: 19 August – 26 August 2011

India on Four Wheels is a documentary shown in the UK on BBC Two where Justin Rowlatt and Anita Rani travel around India sampling the changes and problems that growing car usage has brought to the country in the last two decades.

The show was first broadcast on Friday 19 August and Friday 26 August 2011 as a two-part series. The programme was shown at 9pm and on BBC Two and BBC HD. The presenters, Justin Rowlatt and Anita Rani travelled on two different journeys. Rani travelled in a modern, small 4x4 representing India's car economy of today, whereas Rowlatt travelled in an older Indian car visiting many places where people didn't have a car, or where they were only just discovering them.

== Episodes ==
No.	Original release date	Viewers (millions)	Weekly channel ranking
1	19 August 2011	2.36	5
2	26 August 2011	2.32	6

== Reception ==
"Justin Rowlatt and Anita Rani facilitate two contrasting perspectives on the growing and increasingly motorized economies of India and China.", wrote Nina Mickwitz, relating the series to its parallel China on Four Wheels (BBC2, 2012).

== See also ==
- Automotive industry in India
