= Sunner =

Sunner (Punjabi: ਸੁੰਨੜ) is a Punjabi Jatt got or clan found in the Punjab region of India,

== Sunner villages of Punjab ==
- Sunner Kalan (Jalandhar District)
- Sunner Khurd (Jalandhar District)
- Sunran Rajputan (Kapurthala District - near Phagwara)
- Rampur Sunra (Kapurthala District - near Phagwara)
- Sunrawala (Kapurthala District)
