= Thalsevana Holiday Resort =

- Former names: Kankesanthurai Rest House

General information
- Location: Kankesanthurai, Sri Lanka
- Coordinates: 9°48′57.30″N 80°02′55.00″E
- Current tenants: Sri Lanka Army
- Renovated: 2 October 2010
- Owner: Government of Sri Lanka

Other information
- Number of rooms: 31

Website
- www.thalsevanaresort.lk

Thalsevana Holiday Resort is a holiday resort on the northern coast of Sri Lanka near the town of Kankesanthurai. Formerly Kankesanthurai Rest House, it was taken over by the Sri Lankan military during the civil war. After the civil war the military renovated the buildings and turned them into a holiday resort.

== History ==
During British colonial rule a network of rest houses were built around Ceylon. Kankesanthurai Rest House was run by the Northern Provincial Road Committee. After independence the rest houses were taken over by the state owned Ceylon Hotels Corporation.

In 1990 the Sri Lankan military declared a large area of the north of the Valikamam region a High Security Zone (HSZ) and forcibly evicted all the residents in the area without offering them compensation. Kankesanthurai Rest House was deep inside the HSZ. It was taken over by the Sri Lankan military and used as an officer's mess. After the civil war ended the military renovated the buildings and turned them into a holiday resort known as Thalsevana. The renovated resort opened on 2 October 2010.
