= Pref (artist) =

British graffiti fine artist muralist

- Born: London, England, UK
- Education: Chelsea College of Arts
- Known for: Visual Art; Conceptual Art; Graffiti; Street art
- Movement: Contemporary Art
- Website: prefprefpref.com

Pref is a British graffiti fine artist and muralist. He is known for his multi-layered typographic style graffiti, incorporating an exploration of common words and key vernacular phrases.

== Career ==
Pref has developed his role and reputation as a graffiti artist over 20 years, and trained initially at Chelsea College of Arts before going on to work in graphic design. His multi-layered style means that an element of deciphering is introduced, the viewer being asked to disentangle images and meanings from the artwork. The clear linear elements of his work and Pref's evolving interest in typography trespass across the borders of fine and graphic art in energetic and intriguing ways.
In 2019, he collaborated with Italian luxury fashion brand Fendi to create a capsule collection based on his designs.
He also participated in an exhibition and event curated by Justin Bieber.

== Selected works ==
- Pref Solo Exhibition, La Galerie Centrale, Liege, Belgium (2021)
- Sway exhibition, Moberg gallery, Iowa, USA (2020)
- Breitling Watches, Mural Commission, London, UK (2020)
- Les Poupees Russes, Digital Artwork commission (2020)
- Mars Wrigley's, Mural Commission, London, UK (2020)
- Powow Hawaii exhibition, Thinkspace Gallery, Hawaii, USA (2020)
- The Biebers x Lift exhibition, UTA Artist Space, California, USA (2019)
- YMC clothing, Capsule collection collaboration, London, UK (2019)
- Talking Walls Charlotte, Mural Commission, Charlotte, USA (2019)
- Typograffic Circle exhibition, Moniker Art Far, London, UK (2019)
- London Mural Festival, Logo Design, London, UK (2019)
- Principal Insurance, Mural Commission, Iowa, USA (2019)
- LAX / ORD pt.II exhibition, Vertical Gallery, Chicago, USA (2019)
- Foundation Mesh, Mural Commission, Rotterdam, NL (2019)
- In Bloom exhibition, Moberg gallery, Iowa, USA (2019)
- LAX / SFO Pt. III, Heron arts / Thinkspace gallery, San Francisco, USA (2019)
- Fendi, Capsule Collection, Rome, Italy (2019)
- Seeing Red exhibition, Thinkspace Art Gallery, California, USA (2019)
- What You On? exhibition, Moosey Art Gallery, London, UK (2019)
- Analogue Digital exhibition, The Other Art Fair / Saatchi Art, London, UK (2019)
- Control And Disorder exhibition, Gallery 42b, Paris, France (2018)
- Unexpected Festival, Mural Commission x 2, Arkansas, USA (2018)
- Typograffic Circle exhibition, StolenSpace Gallery, London, UK (2018)
- Better Together store, Mural Commission, New Mexico, USA (2018)
- Heuristic exhibition, Wollongong Art Gallery, Wollongong, Australia (2017)
- Global street art, Mural Commission, London, UK (2017)
- Question and Answer, Mural Commission, Brighton, UK (2017)
- Calleganera Festival, Mural Commission x 2, Monterrey, Mexico (2016)
- Smoke and Mirrors exhibition, StolenSpace Gallery, London, UK (2016)
- Step In the Arena, Mural commission, Eindhoven, NL (2016)
- Write Now exhibition, Hangfire Gallery, Bristol, UK (2015)
- Rule of Three exhibition, Colab gallery, Weil am Rhein, Germany (2014)
