= Tagar, Punjab =

Taggar
- Village
- Location in Punjab, India Taggar (India)
- Coordinates: 31.1050114°N 75.6589901°E
- Country: India
- State: Punjab
- District: Jalandhar

Government
  - Type: Panchayat raj
  - Body: Gram panchayat
- Elevation: 240 m (790 ft)

Population (2011)
  - Total: 858
- Sex ratio 454/404 ♂/♀

Languages
  - Official: Punjabi
- Time zone: UTC+5:30 (IST)
- PIN: 144031
- ISO 3166 code: IN-PB
- Vehicle registration: PB- 08
- Website: jalandhar.nic.in

Tagar or Taggar is a village in Jalandhar district of Punjab State, India. It is located 9 km from Nurmahal, 21 km from Phillaur, 29.9 km from district headquarter Jalandhar and 142 km from state capital Chandigarh. The village is administrated by a sarpanch, who is an elected representative.

== Demography ==
As of the 2011 Census of India, the village has a total number of 180 houses and a population of 858 of which include 454 are males while 404 are females. The literacy rate of the village is 81.81%, higher than state average of 75.84%. The population of children under the age of 6 years is 83 which is 9.67% of total population of the village, and child sex ratio is approximately 1128 higher than the state average of 846.

Most of the people are from Schedule Castes, which constitute 47.44% of the total population in the village. The town does not have any people from the Schedule Tribes.

As per census 2011, 321 people were engaged in work activities out of the total population of the village which includes 306 males and 15 females. According to census survey report 2011, 99.07% workers describe their work as main work and 0.93% workers are involved in marginal activity providing livelihood for less than 6 months.

== Transport ==
Nurmahal railway station is the nearest train station however, Phagwara Junction train station is 21.2 km away from the village. The village is 52 km away from domestic airport in Ludhiana and the nearest international airport is located in Chandigarh also Sri Guru Ram Dass Jee International Airport is the second nearest airport which is 122 km away in Amritsar.

== See also ==
- List of villages in India
