= Harkishan Singh Surjeet =

Indian Communist politician (1916-2008)

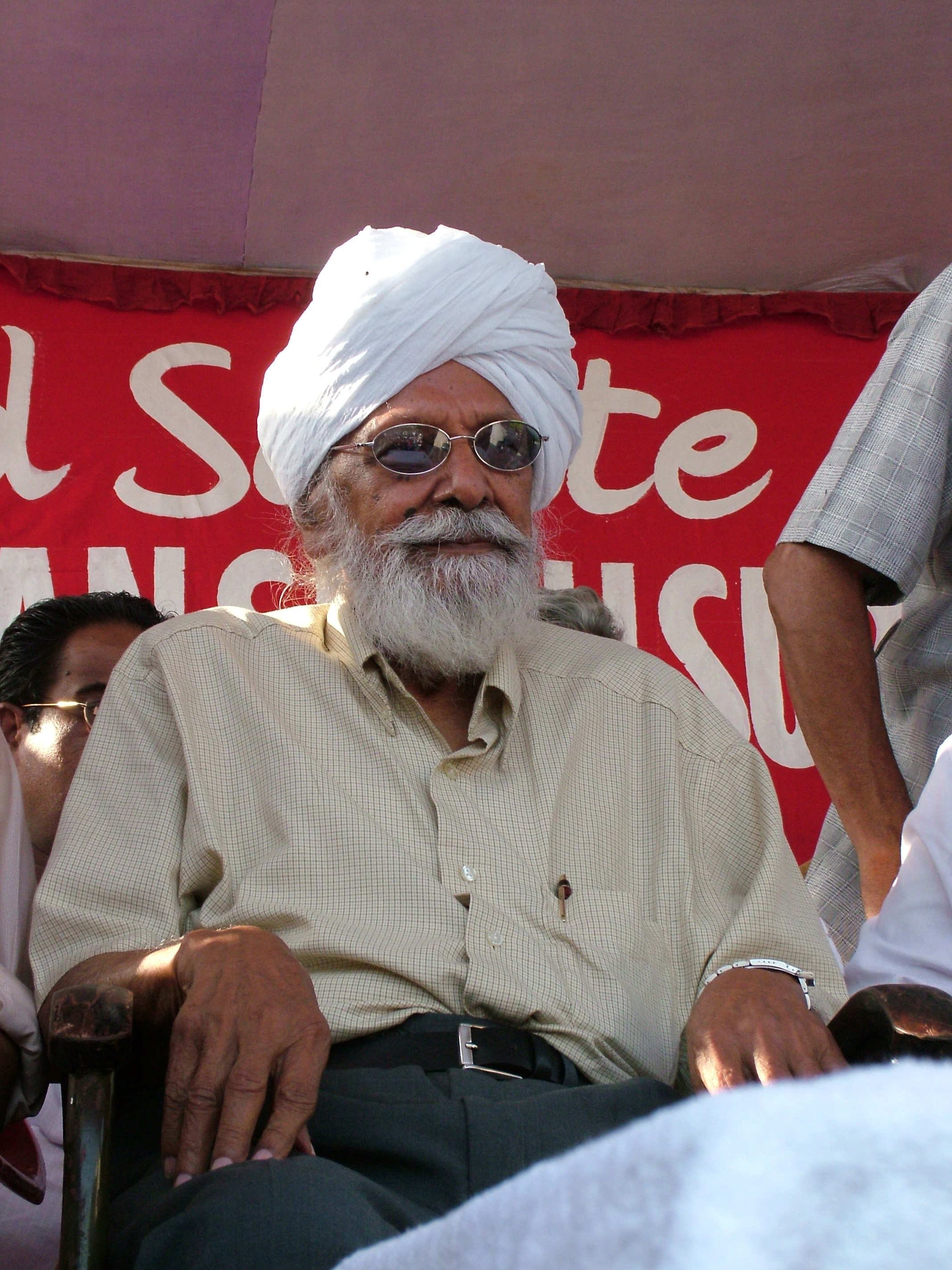
- Surjeet in 2003

General Secretary of the Communist Party of India (Marxist)
- In office 10 January 1992 – 11 April 2005
- Preceded by: E. M. S. Namboodiripad
- Succeeded by: Prakash Karat

Member of the Polit Bureau of the Communist Party of India (Marxist)
- In office 7 November 1964 – 3 April 2008

President of All India Kisan Sabha
- Affiliations: Communist Party of India (Marxist)

Personal details
- Born: 23 March 1916 Bundala, Punjab, British India
- Died: 1 August 2008 (aged 92) Noida, Uttar Pradesh, India
- Party: Communist Party of India (Marxist)
- Known for: Co-founder of Communist Party of India (Marxist)

Harkishan Singh Surjeet (23 March 1916 – 1 August 2008) was an Indian Communist politician from Punjab, who served as the General Secretary of the Communist Party of India (Marxist) from 1992 to 2005 and was a member of the party's Polit Bureau from 1964 to 2008.

== Early life and pre-1947 career ==
Harkishan Singh Surjeet was born in 1916 in a Jat Sikh family in the village of Bundala, Jalandhar district of Punjab. He started his political career in the national liberation movement in his early teens, as a follower of the revolutionary socialist Bhagat Singh and in 1930 joined his Naujawan Bharat Sabha. In 1936, Surjeet joined the Communist Party of India. He was a co-founder of the Kisan Sabha (Farmer's Union) in Punjab. In the pre-war years he started publishing Dukhi Duniya and Chingari. During the War, Surjeet was imprisoned by the colonial authorities. When India became independent and partitioned in 1947, Surjeet was the Secretary of CPI in Punjab. Although he sported a Sikh turban, throughout his life, Surjeet remained an atheist.

== Role in the Communist Party ==
The seven and a half decades-long political life of Harkishan Singh Surjeet began with his staunch fight against British colonial rule. He played a pioneering role in developing the farmer's movement and the Communist Party in Punjab before emerging as a national leader of the Communist Party of India and the All India Kisan Sabha. It culminated with his leading role in the CPI(M) for an eventful four decades.

Surjeet began his revolutionary career influenced by the martyrdom of Bhagat Singh. He hoisted the tricolour in March 1932 at the district court in Hoshiarpur at the age of 16. He was arrested and sent to a reformatory school for juvenile offenders. He came in touch with the early Communist pioneers in Punjab after his release. He joined the Communist Party in 1934 and became a member of the Congress Socialist Party in 1935. He was elected as the secretary of the Punjab State Kisan Sabha in 1938. The same year, he was externed from Punjab and went to Saharanpur in Uttar Pradesh where he started a monthly paper, 'Chingari'. He went underground after the outbreak of the second world war and was arrested in 1940. He was imprisoned in the notorious Lahore Red Fort where he was kept for three months in solitary confinement in terrible conditions. Later he was shifted to Deoli detention camp where he remained till 1944. During the partition, he tirelessly worked for communal harmony in violence-torn Punjab.

Just after independence, Surjeet was forced to go underground for four years. Several other communist leaders like A K Gopalan were arrested under the preventive detention laws. In the 1950s he led the historic anti-betterment levy movement in Punjab in 1959. His work with farmers led to his election as General Secretary and then President of the All India Kisan Sabha. He also worked in the Agricultural Workers Union. When the CPI split in 1964, Surjeet sided with the Communist Party of India (Marxist). Surjeet was one of the nine members of the original CPI(M) Polit Bureau.

== General Secretary ==
He continued to rise within the party until he was elected General Secretary of the Central Committee of the CPI(M) in 1992, a post he held till 2005, retiring at the age of 89. Surjeet is known for his steadfast opposition to the BJP and communalism. He was instrumental in forming a number of anti-BJP coalitions in the 1990s and for ensuring left support the present UPA government. After retiring from his post as General Secretary, Surjeet continued to play an active role in Indian national politics. Many times, including after the 2004 Lok Sabha election and during the 1996-1998 United Front government, his role has been that of a cunning king-maker in parliamentary politics, mending and assembling broad coalitions.

With his health declining, Surjeet was, for the first time, not included in the CPI(M) Politburo at the party's 19th congress in early April 2008. He was instead designated as Special Invitee to the Central Committee. Surjeet died in New Delhi on 1 August 2008 of cardiac arrest. Surjeet, aged 92, had been convalescing at the Metro Hospital in Noida since 25 July 2008.

=== Lok Sabha Election Results under leadership of Surjeet ===
Performance of Communist Party of India (Marxist) in Lok Sabha elections
Lok Sabha	Lok Sabha constituencies	Seats Contested	Won	Net Change in seats	Votes	Votes %	Change in vote %	Reference
Eleventh, 1996	543	75	32	▼03	20,496,810	6.12%	▼0.02%	
Twelfth, 1998	543	71	32	00	18,991,867	5.16%	▼0.96%	
Thirteenth, 1999	543	72	33	▲01	19,695,767	5.40%	▲0.24%	
Fourteenth, 2004	543	69	43	▲10	22,070,614	5.66%	▲0.26%	

== Role in Rajya Sabha and Punjab Legislative Assembly ==
Surjeet was member of the Punjab Legislative Assembly from 1954 to 1959. In 1967, he was elected to the Punjab legislative assembly for the CPI (M) and served till 1972. He was elected as a member of Rajya Sabha in the Indian parliament on 10 April 1978 and served till 9 April 1984.

== Novel ==
A literary work in Punjab titled Bhauu, which has uncanny resemblance to the life of Surjeet was written by Darshan Singh, a close associate of Surjeet. The novel remained unknown till it was printed by the mainstream media. The newspaper article sparked a flurry of coverage and it was then reported by most Indian newspapers. Though the author Darshan Singh claimed that the novel was not based on the life of Surjeet, he termed his novel "virtual reality". He did say that "novels have been written about American presidents without naming them". The main character is named Karam Singh Kirti, with Kirti meaning a worker in Punjabi - a term often used by the left wing in Punjab. The Communist Part of India (Marxist), with which Surjeet was affiliated, was unhappy at the description of Surjeet in the novel.

== Death ==
Surjeet died on 1 August 2008.
