= Dhesian Kahna =

- village
- Location in Punjab, India Dhesian Kahna (India)
- Coordinates: 31.148237°N 75.686592°E
- Country: India
- State: Punjab
- District: Jalandhar

Government
  - Type: Gram Panchyat, Local Government
  - Body: State Government Of Punjab, Government of India

Population (in 2011 Recorded as)
  - Total: 3,324 peoples

Languages
  - Official: Punjabi
- Time zone: UTC+5:30 (IST)
- PIN: 144311
- Area code: 91-182-6XX XXXX
- Vehicle registration: PB- 08, PB- 37

Dhesian Kahna is a village in Jalandhar district under Phillaur Divisional Tehsil in the northern Indian state of Punjab.

== Air transport ==
The nearest airport to Village Dhesian Kahna is Sahnewal Airport, located in Ludhiana. The airport runs a limited service; other regional airports provide a regular service and a wider choice of destinations. Sri Guru Ram Dass Jee International Airport in Amritsar offers regional air travel as well as destinations in the Middle East, North America and Europe. Regular regional air services can also be caught from Chandigarh Airport, which is currently in the progress of upgrading to International Airport capability. Flydubai were keen to start operating an international air service between Dubai and Chandigarh but the proposal fell through due to the lack of facilities.
