= Talwan =

Talwan, Punjab
- Village
- Location in Punjab, India Talwan, Punjab (India)
- Coordinates: 31°01′N 75°37′E
- Country: India
- State: Punjab
- District: Jalandhar

Languages
  - Official: Punjabi
- Time zone: UTC+5:30 (IST)
- PIN: 144039
- Telephone code: 1826
- Vehicle registration: PB-08

Talwan is a village in Punjab near the city of Nurmahal. Nurmahal is a sub-tehsil in the district Jalandhar in the Indian state of Punjab.

Talwan town is situated on the bank shore of Sutlej river that is the longest of the five rivers that flow through the historic crossroads region of Punjab in northern India and Pakistan. Talwan lies on the Jalandhar-Nurmahal-Talwan Major District Road 82 (MDR 82) of Punjab. The development block for Talwan is Nurmahal. The nearest railway station to Talwan is Nurmahal railway station at a distance of 8 km. Talwan falls into Dhagara(village)

== Notable people from Talwan ==
Swami Shraddhanand (Munshiram) who was a freedom fighter, social reformer and founder of Gurukul Kangri, was born in Talwan.

== Pin Code & STD codes ==
Talwan's pin code & STD Code is 144039 & 01826 respectively.
