= Bilga =

- Village
- Location in Punjab, India Bilga (India)
- Coordinates: 31°03′N 75°39′E
- Country: India
- State: Punjab
- District: Jalandhar

Population (2011)
  - Total: 10,125

Languages
  - Official: Punjabi
- Time zone: UTC+5:30 (IST)
- PIN: 144036
- Telephone code: 1826
- Vehicle registration: PB- 08 & PB - 37

Bilga is a large village near the city of Nurmahal. Nurmahal is a sub tehsil in the district Jalandhar in the Indian state of Punjab.

== About ==
The majority of people living in Bilga are of Sikh religion. The nearest main road to Bilga is Phillaur-Nurmahal road which is almost 2 km from the village. The nearest Railway station to this village is the Bilga railway station.

In the centre of the town there is a large gurudwara, of historical significance, the Shri Guru Arjan Dev Sikh Temple, as the 5th Guru of the Sikhs, Shri Guru Arjan Dev Ji (first Sikh Guru to be martyred) had visited the area during the time of his wedding in the neighbouring village of Meo in the year 1589. People from all over the world visit this gurdwara. Shri Guru Arjan Dev ji's Vastras(clothes) are still present there and are on display.

== History ==
Bilga was Founded by the Son of Chaudhary Sahu Ram Sanghera Jatt who was originally from Village Sanghera in Barnala, he had 2 sons named Bhikhi and Phool who came to Doaba for doing Shikaar and in year 1314, Bhikhi's brother Phool rai Sanghera Founded Phillaur City, Sahu ram also had one Uncle (Chacha) nad Named Neelo. Bhikhi had 4 sons Bhoja, Mehna, Bagga and Bhatti, Phool had 2 Sons Bhalai and Mansoor (Dunia, Mansoor) these 7 sons of Bhikhi and Phool as well as Neelo founded 8 Pattis of the village, which are 1 Patti Bhoja, 2 Patti Mehna, 3 Patti Bagga, 4 Patti Bhatti, 5 Patti Bhalai, 6 Patti Mansoor, 7 Patti Dunia and 8 Patti Neelowal. the name Bilga came from the Previous owner of the area who were 2 brothers Bega and tega\talla (founder of Talwan) who were Manj rajputs, once Tega betrayed Bega and controlled more land. Bega was Friend of Bhikhi and after being scammed by his brother Sold the land to Sangheras and they named the village after their Friend's name as Begewala and it evolved into Bilga, But Bega also cursed the land so till 1590s there was not any big settlement, but when guru Arjan Dev ji visited the village they broke the curse and blessed the village to become prosper.

== Demographics ==
At the 2011 census, the population of the village was 10,125 of which 5,182 were male and 4,943 female, a sex ratio of 954. There were 949 children aged 6 or under, which was 9.37%. The literacy rate was 81.69% - 85.73% for males and 77.49% for females.

This village has one sarpanch who has been elected by villagers under the legislative committee of Jalandhar.

The village is also close to the Bilga general hospital which is located on the outskirts of the village.

The village is divided in 7 portions (portion of a village is known as a patti) which have their own names, these are :

- Patti Bhalaayi
- Patti Duniya Mansoor
- Patti Bhoja
- Patti Mahena
- Patti Bagga
- Patti Bhatti
- Patti Neelowaal
