= Nurmahal =

Nurmahal ਨੂਰ ਮਹਿਲ, نور محل Kot Kehlur
- City
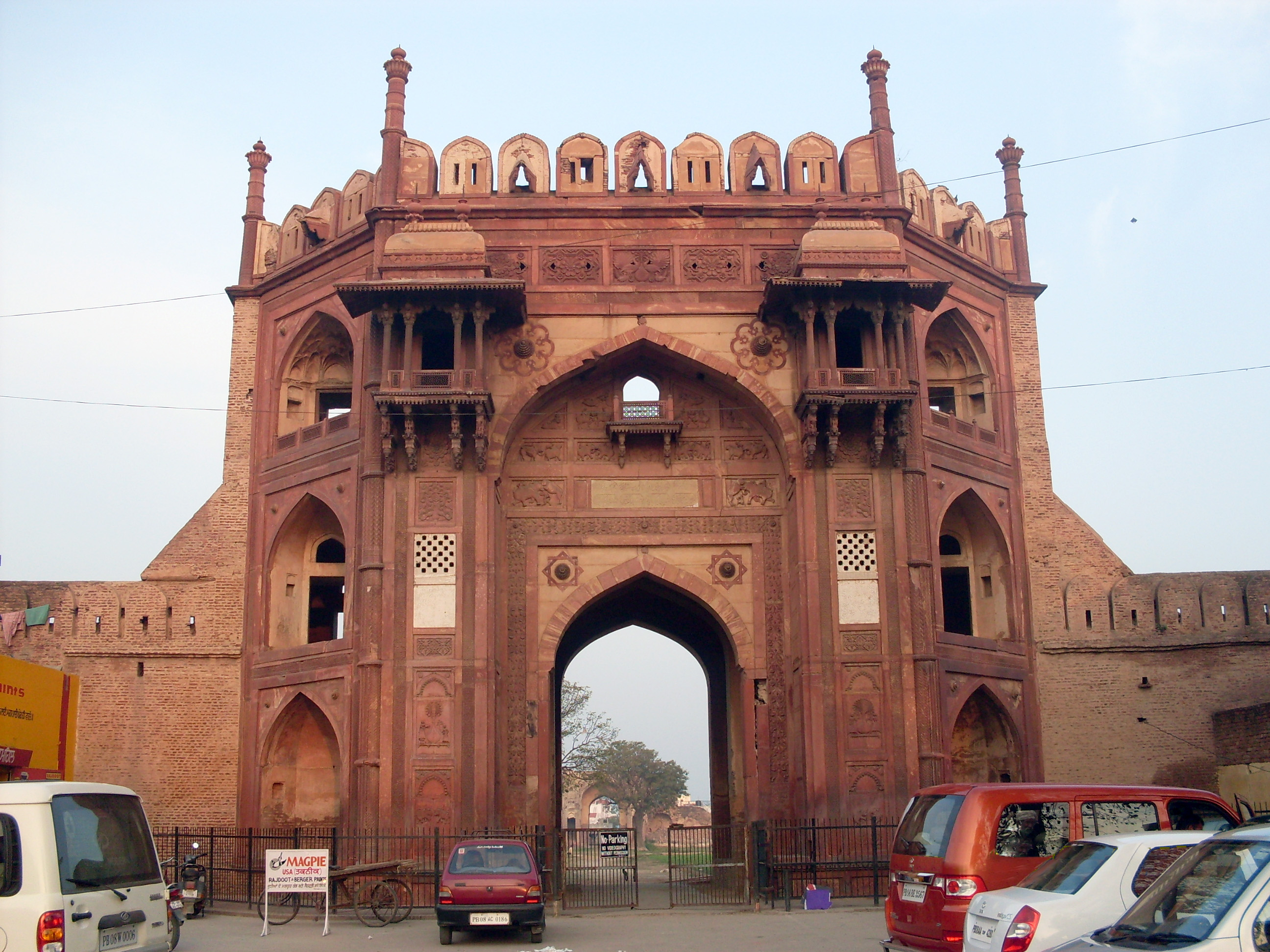
- Nurmahal Sarai

- Location within Punjab Location within India
- Coordinates: 31.095°N 75.593°E
- Country: India
- State: Punjab
- District: Jalandhar
- Elevation: 224 m (735 ft)

Population (2001)
  - Total: 12,630

Languages
  - Official: Punjabi
- Time zone: UTC+5:30 (IST)
- Postal Index Number,: 144039
- Telephone code: 01826

NurMahal or Noor Mahal is a city and a municipal council in Jalandhar district in the Indian state of Punjab. It is a small city located between Nakodar - Phillaur Road in Punjab. This town is also connected with the nearby towns of Phillaur and Nakodar by a road going along the railway lines. Nurmahal is situated 13 km from Nakodar, 16 km from Phillaur, 33 km from Jalandhar. And Many more villages are close by to Nurmahal.

== History ==
Nurmahal was built on a place where an ancient town, called Kot Kahlur, was located which was proven by the bricks and many coins found beneath the soil of this town. It is believed that the ancient city was abandoned or destroyed around 1300 for an unknown reason. Maharaja Jassa Singh Ahluwalia took this city under his control.

Nurmahal is named after Noor Jahan, the wife of Mughal emperor Jahangir (1605–1627) as she was brought up here, and is thought to have spent her childhood here. The town then came under the rule of Jassa Ahluwalia’s Sikhs before the East India Company gained control.

== Sarai Nurmahal ==
Major point of tourist interest in Nurmahal is the Mughal Serai constructed by Noor Jahan. It is a striking example of oriental architecture. This historical monument is looked after by the Archaeological Department. The whole structure of the sarai is in the form of quadrangle consisting of 140 cells, spread over the four sides of the structure.

The best way to reach Serai Nurmahal is to go to Nurmahal railway station, which is the nearest railway station. The junction is served by the Northern Railways. Nurmahal has railway station and had Cinema next to the bus stop that shut down around 1995 also got huge grain market. Nurmahal has got its own Railway Station also which is situated on Phillaur - Lohian khas line.

== Demographics ==
As of 2001 India census, NurMahal had a population of 12,630. Males constitute 53% of the population and females 47%. Noor Mahal has an average literacy rate of 71%, higher than the national average of 59.5%: male literacy is 73%, and female literacy is 68%. In Noor Mahal, 13% of the population is under 6 years of age.

Nurmahal(Noor Mahal) Kandola Kalan (there is two villages near by Nurmahal) 1st is Kandola Kalan (big Kandola) 2nd is Kandola Khurd (small Kandola)

- Ladhar Kalan

== See also ==
- Jab Harry Met Sejal have some scenes filmed in this city.
