= Vijaynagar =

Vijayanagar or Vijayanagara (meaning "city of victory") may refer to:

== Places ==
=== India ===
- Vijayanagara Empire (or Karnata Empire), of Southern India, 14th–17th centuries A.D.
  - Vijayanagara, capital city of the Vijayanagara Empire
    - Vijayanagara metropolitan area
  - Vijayanagara (Karnataka Assembly constituency), Assembly constituency in Karnataka, India
- Vijayanagar, Bangalore, neighborhood in Bangalore, Karnataka, India
  - Vijay Nagar (Vidhana Sabha constituency), Assembly constituency
- Vijayanagar, Mysore, neighbourhood in Mysore, Karnataka, India
- Vijayanagar, Belgaum, a small village in Belgaum District, Karnataka
- Vijayanagar, Hubli, neighbourhood in Hubli, Karnataka, India
- Vijayanagar, Davanagere, neighbourhood in Davanagere, Karnataka, India
- Vijayanagar, Chitradurga, neighbourhood in Chitradurga, Karnataka, India
- Vijayanagar, Hassan, neighbourhood in Hassan, Karnataka, India
- VIjayanagar, Arasikere, village in Arasikere Taluk, Hassan, Karnataka, India
- VIjayanagar, Belagavi, village in Chikkodi Taluk, Belagavi, Karnataka, India
- VIjayanagar, Indi, village in Indi Taluk, Vijayapura district, Karnataka, India
- VIjayanagar, Muddebihal, village in Muddebihal Taluk, Vijayapura district, Karnataka, India
- VIjayanagar, Bidar, village in Aurad Taluk, Bidar, Karnataka, India
- VIjaynagar, Kalaburagi, village in Aland Taluk, Kalaburagi, Karnataka, India
- Vijay Nagar, Ghaziabad, neighbourhood in Ghaziabad District, Uttar Pradesh
- Vijayanagar, Hyderabad, neighbourhood in Hyderabad, Telangana
- Vijaynagar, Arunachal Pradesh, a town in Changlang district of Arunachal Pradesh
- Vijaynagar tehsil, in Srigangagnagar district of Rajasthan
- VIjaynagar, Sangli, neighbourhood in Sangli, Maharashtra, India
- VIjaynagar, Miraj, village in Miraj Taluka, Sangli, Maharashtra, India
- Vijay Nagar, Indore, neighbourhood in Indore city, Madhya Pradesh
- Vizianagaram, Andhra Pradesh, also known as Vijayanagaram
- Vizianagaram district, Andhra Pradesh
- Vijaynagar State, a princely state in Gujarat
- Vijaynagar taluka, a taluka in Gujarat
- Vijoy Nagar, a village in Nicobar district
- Vijay Nagar, fictional place in the 2025 Indian horror comedy film Thama (working title Vampires of Vijay Nagar), part of the Maddock Horror Comedy Universe

=== Nepal ===
- Bijaya Nagar, a V.D.C. in Pyuthan District

== See also ==
- Vijay (disambiguation)
- Vijaya (disambiguation)
- Nagar (disambiguation)
- Nagara (disambiguation)
- Bahmani–Vijayanagar War (disambiguation)
