= Bharkhani =

- Populated place
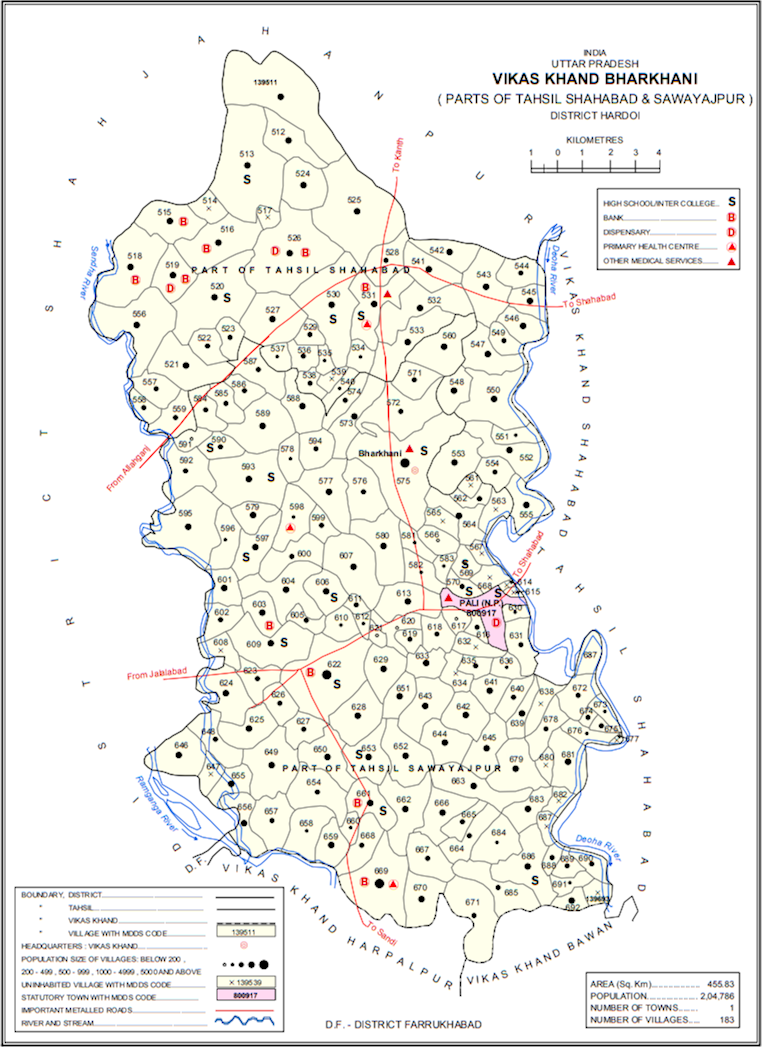
- Map showing Bharkhani (#575) in Bharkhani CD block

- Location in Uttar Pradesh, India Bharkhani (India)
- Coordinates: 27.584465°N 79.79708°E
- Country: India
- State: Uttar Pradesh
- District: Hardoi

Area
  - Total: 10.661 km^{2} (4.116 sq mi)

Population (2011)
  - Total: 5,681
  - Density: 532.9/km^{2} (1,380/sq mi)

Languages
  - Official: Hindi
- Time zone: UTC+5:30 (IST)

Bharkhani is a village and corresponding community development block in Hardoi district of Uttar Pradesh, India. It has several schools, one clinic, and a public library, and there is a regular market as well as a weekly haat. A fair called Banshi Baba is held here on Chaitra Badi 30. The main staple crops here are wheat and rice. As of 2011, the population of Bharkhani is 5,681, in 888 households.

== Demographic history ==
The 1961 census recorded Bharkhani as comprising 6 hamlets, with a combined population of 2,383 (1,263 male and 1,120 female), in 498 households and 294 physical houses. The area of the village was given as 2,682 acres.

The 1981 census recorded Bharkhani as having a population of 3,366, in 656 households, and covering an area of 1,065.98 hectares.

== Villages ==
Bharkhani CD block has the following 183 villages:

Village name	Total land area (hectares)	Population (in 2011)
Lakhnaur	894.7	4,655
Sahsoga	226.6	1,020
Kamalpur	937	4,450
Hullapur	101.1	0
Pateora	271	1,991
Bhabhar Keshopur	369.2	2,002
Ahukhana	68.5	0
Baruara	498.7	2,489
Kurari	288.9	1,534
Maikpur	551	3,263
Ghaso	374.4	1,115
Girdhar	153.4	931
Jujharpur	175.6	536
Ubri Khera	221.1	1,584
Naibasti	819	3,662
Pachdeora	721.4	4,151
Amtara	432.6	2,918
Pakra	201.4	946
Udaipur	82.6	631
Sultanpur	606.2	1,964
Anangpur	393	3,088
Murtaza Nagar	394.8	1,561
Jalpapur	270.7	1,708
Dariyabad	102	221
Gautia	52.2	499
Chakrachha	79.4	797
Biriya	92.3	234
Jamalpur	52	881
Lalpur	67.2	0
Naya Gaon	87.7	305
Chandpur	218.2	1,100
Nagla Husain	160.8	1,046
Kundi	368.6	2,215
Nasa	207.8	713
Pipariya	136.6	1,169
Kapoorpur	202.6	1,013
Kheriya	182.7	1,160
Narbha	195.3	1,026
Chandrampur	158.5	585
Birampur	329.7	1,593
Umaria Kalan	119.7	314
Khwajgipur	272.5	1,895
Mundramau	277.2	1,681
Randhirpur	160.5	579
Kaharkola	332.3	1,334
Bhahpur Sapha	540.9	1,234
Dwar Nagla	143.2	521
Ghanu Nagla	142.6	956
Dhani Nagla	212.5	935
Manpara	344.5	1,200
Rudrapur	53.4	0
Rupapur	135	1,162
Babarpur Pansala	5.5	0
Babarpur Sisala	396.8	2,474
Chanduapur	51.8	0
Menghpur	129.5	120
Hunseypur	47.9	0
Sarai Saif Sisala	48.7	0
Sarai Saif Pansala	151.1	489
Bhagwantpur	72.9	825
Sakrauli	165.8	553
Naglapattu	416.8	982
Ramapur	297.9	1,276
Kunwarpur	78.3	915
Bharkhani (block headquarters)	1,066.1	5,681
Pachraiya	282.7	794
Hasnapur	338.9	1,967
Bilsari Malik	128.3	434
Malikapur	240.9	1,303
Paintpur	350.5	1,447
Binaika Mafi	188.2	426
Deoniapur Balbhadra	906	363
Sandi Khera	39.2	233
Bahrampur	140	741
Serhamau	132.2	951
Newada	150.8	536
Sahuapur	182.8	820
Bilsar Helan	282.9	1,475
Bilsar Harsen	387.9	1,309
Naseerpur	138.8	690
Bibiyapur	230.4	56
Bisauli	344.9	792
Man Nagla	474	2,067
Ismailpur	186.9	926
Hathuara	565.9	1,903
Atariya	200.2	437
Daghela	262.9	2,159
Baragaon	240.6	341
Thariya	109.2	648
Rajuapur	221.3	598
Mahmoodpur	157.3	1,064
Tera	186.8	691
Nagla Bhainsi	187.5	1,416
Farigahana	392	2,629
Aliyapur	103.4	613
Behti	221	1,417
Jeora	750.7	2,084
Deoniyapur Sarsai	91.5	0
Semar Jhala	658.4	2,275
Dhauraliya	97.7	295
Gajiyapur	44.3	568
Adampur	44.7	473
Nizampur	279.8	2,853
Pali Dehat Sisala	129.4	0
Pali Dehat Pansala	13.5	0
Ahmadpur	81.7	511
Rajarampur	73.7	69
Bhahpur	144.1	510
Khankalapur	97.1	890
Jahanpur	123.4	195
Akhri	71.8	177
Munder	655.1	6,233
Kausiya	122.8	576
Sarsai	345.5	1,645
Timirpur	210.7	1,325
Saidapur	128.5	948
Markara	187.5	811
Amirta	342.4	1,311
Rahtaura	290	1,699
Khwajgipur	49.1	438
Dharampur	169.1	534
Kishanpur	131.1	0
Ratanpur	165.4	1,118
Garhuapur	599.1	0
Ramapur Lal	107.7	541
Ramdaspur	68.8	480
Mahamdapur	59.8	0
Khanjahanpur	94.7	0
Asmadha	134.4	1,303
Daulatpur	37.1	664
Bhorapur	180.5	1,309
Sahjanpur	429	1,836
Nand Khera	269.2	1,394
Baseliya	82.8	1,022
Gaura Udaipur	252.8	1,280
Kahrai Naktaura Sisala	210	1,878
Kahrai Naktaura Pansala	72	0
Raipur	181	905
Kankapur Ubariya	450.2	2,349
Kanhari	246	1,471
Bahauddinpur	155.3	1,191
Kaitha	150.9	1,014
Pandeypur	273.8	1,931
Rajpur Labhera	206.4	671
Ubriakalan	360	1,350
Chakauti Khurd	236.1	1,114
Chakauti Kalan	255.5	943
Ubariya Khurd	254	416
Khetauli	188.1	1,022
[[Nizampur Saida]]	49.5	408
Rampura Khamariya	560.2	2,111
Madnapur	192	1,692
Chaura Rai	924	2,112
Singhapur	205.1	717
Jaitpur	328	506
Semariya	270.6	1,380
Khandaua Mirzapur	244.1	987
Gaur Khera	236.1	971
Sawaizpur	512.5	5,044
Silwari	642	1,862
Dhikaha	814	817
Ramapur Misra	129.9	579
Pahunchna Khera	85.6	223
Lakhmapur Sisala	193	789
Lakhmapur Pansala	54.4	715
Haran Kuda Sisala	45.7	490
Haran Kuda Pansala	72	0
Gurdharu	84.8	549
Salhoni Sisala	136.5	2,482
Salhoni Pansala	83.3	0
Dahirapur	1,484.6	1,005
Saraj Ragho Pansala	100.1	0
Sarai Ragho Sisala	241.3	2,363
Nagla Pahladpur	195.2	324
Udharna Pur	279.5	687
Bhaila Mau Sisala	389.8	1,695
Bhaila Mau Pansala	40.4	0
Kankapur Lal	40.3	750
Binaika Akbarpur Sisala	51.6	632
Binaika Akbarpur Pansala	153.9	500
Menhdiyarpur	88.8	220
Baroura Sisala	123.8	1,426
Baraura Pansala	92	0
