= Negara =

Negara may refer to:

- Negara, Bali, a city in Indonesia
- Negara: The Theatre State in Nineteenth-Century Bali, a book by anthropologist Clifford Geertz
- Negara Brunei Darussalam, official name of Brunei, a country located on the north coast of the island of Borneo
- Negara Islam Indonesia, an Islamist group in Indonesia that aims for the establishment of an Islamic state of Indonesia
- Negara Daha, a former Hindu kingdom now located in the Hulu Sungai Selatan Regency, South Kalimantan, Indonesia
- Negara River, a river of Borneo, Indonesia

== See also ==
- Nagara (disambiguation)
- Nagar (disambiguation)
- Nagari (disambiguation)
- Angkor (disambiguation)
