= Bakapur, Phillaur =

Bakapur
- Village
- Location in Punjab, India Bakapur (India)
- Coordinates: 31.0547997°N 75.769465°E
- Country: India
- State: Punjab
- District: Jalandhar
- Tehsil: Phillaur

Government
  - Type: Panchayat raj
  - Body: Gram panchayat
- Elevation: 246 m (807 ft)

Population (2011)
  - Total: 1,403
- Sex ratio 711/692 ♂/♀

Languages
  - Official: Punjabi
- Time zone: UTC+5:30 (IST)
- PIN: 144410
- Telephone code: 01826
- ISO 3166 code: IN-PB
- Vehicle registration: PB 37
- Post Office: Phillaur
- Website: jalandhar.nic.in

Bakapur is a village in Phillaur tehsil of Jalandhar district of Punjab State, India. It is located 7 km away from postal head office in Phillaur, 10 km from Goraya, 41.5 km from district headquarter Jalandhar and 115 km from state capital Chandigarh. The village is administrated by a sarpanch who is an elected representative of the village as per Panchayati raj (India).

== Demography ==
As of 2011, Bakapur has a total number of 286 houses and population of 1403 of which 711 are males while 692 are females, according to the report published by Census India in 2011. Literacy rate of Bakapur is 80.06%, higher than state average of 75.84%. The population of children under the age of 6 years is 164 which is 11.69% of total population of Bakapur, and child sex ratio is approximately 1076 as compared to Punjab state average of 846.

Most of the people are from Schedule Caste which constitutes 60.09% of the total population in Bakapur. The town does not have any Schedule Tribe population.

501 people were engaged in work activities out of the total population of Bakapur which includes 415 males and 86 females. According to the 2011 census survey report, 76.85% workers describe their work as main work and 23.15% workers are involved in marginal activity providing livelihood for less than 6 months.

== Education ==
The village has a co-ed primary school founded in 1954. The schools provide a mid-day meal as per the Indian Midday Meal Scheme.

== Transport ==
=== Rail ===
Phillaur Junction is the nearest train station however, Bhattian railway station is 3 km away from the village.

=== Air ===
The nearest domestic airport is located 36.4 km away in Ludhiana and the nearest international airport is located in Chandigarh also Sri Guru Ram Dass Jee International Airport is the second nearest airport which is 138 km away in Amritsar.
