= Muthada Kalan =

- Village
- Location in Punjab, India Muthada Kalan (India)
- Coordinates: 31.0825677°N 75.7486491°E
- Country: India
- State: Punjab
- District: Jalandhar

Government
  - Type: Panchayat raj
  - Body: Gram panchayat
- Elevation: 240 m (790 ft)

Population (2011)
  - Total: 2,400
- Sex ratio 1197/1203 ♂/♀

Languages
  - Official: Punjabi
- Time zone: UTC+5:30 (IST)
- PIN: 144409
- Telephone: 01826
- ISO 3166 code: IN-PB
- Vehicle registration: PB- 08
- Website: jalandhar.nic.in

Muthada Kalan is a village in Jalandhar district of Punjab State, India. It is located 9.4 km from Phillaur, 38.2 km from district headquarter Jalandhar and 122 km from state capital Chandigarh. The village is administrated by a sarpanch who is an elected representative of village as per Panchayati raj (India).

== Demography ==
According to the report published by Census India in 2011, Muthada Kalan has a total number of 497 houses and population of 2400 of which include 1197 males and 1203 females. Literacy rate of Muthada Kalan is 75.21%, lower than state average of 75.84%. The population of children under the age of 6 years is 234 which is 9.75% of total population of Muthada Kalan, and child sex ratio is approximately 1108 higher than state average of 846.

Most of the people are from Schedule Caste which constitutes 50.29% of total population in Muthada Kalan. The town does not have any Schedule Tribe population so far.

As per census 2011, 672 people were engaged in work activities out of the total population of Muthada Kalan which includes 607 males and 65 females. According to census survey report 2011, 93.75% workers describe their work as main work and 6.25% workers are involved in marginal activity providing livelihood for less than 6 months.

== Transport ==
Bhattian railway station is the nearest train station; however, Goraya Junction train station is 8.8 km away from the village. The village is 41.9 km away from domestic airport in Ludhiana and the nearest international airport is located in Chandigarh also Sri Guru Ram Dass Jee International Airport is the second nearest airport which is 135 km away in Amritsar.
