= Nagar =

Nagar may refer to:

== Places ==
- Nagar, an oikonyms in West and South Asia

=== Bangladesh ===
- Nagar, Bogra

=== India ===
- Nagar taluka, Ahmednagar, Maharashtra
- Nagar, Murshidabad, West Bengal
- Nagar, Punjab
- Nagar, Rajasthan, now known as Brij Nagar
- Nagar, Basti district, Uttar Pradesh

=== Iran ===
- Nahar, East Azerbaijan

=== Pakistan ===
- Hunza Valley, also known as the Hunza-Nagar Valley
  - Nagar District, administrative unit
    - Nagarkhas, also known as Oyum-Nagar
  - Nagar (princely state), former autonomous princely state

=== Syria ===
- Nagar, Syria, modern Tell Brak, an ancient city

== People and social groups ==
- Nagar (surname), including a list of people with the name
- Nagar Brahmin, a social group of Gujarat, India

== See also ==
- Naga (disambiguation)
- Nagara (disambiguation)
- Nagari (disambiguation)
- Negara (disambiguation)
- Angkor (disambiguation)
- Ellis Nagar, Tamil Nadu, India
