= Rajauri, Punjab =

Rajauri
- Village
- Location in Punjab, India Rajauri (India)
- Coordinates: 31.0191363°N 75.9076405°E
- Country: India
- State: Punjab
- District: Jalandhar

Government
  - Type: Panchayat raj
  - Body: Gram panchayat
- Elevation: 240 m (790 ft)

Population (2011)
  - Total: 202
- Sex ratio 110/92 ♂/♀

Languages
  - Official: Punjabi
- Time zone: UTC+5:30 (IST)
- PIN: 144410
- ISO 3166 code: IN-PB
- Vehicle registration: PB- 08
- Website: jalandhar.nic.in

Rajauri is a village in Jalandhar district of Punjab State, India. It is located 10 km from Nagar, 17.6 km from Phillaur, 60.8 km from district headquarter Jalandhar and 114 km from state capital Chandigarh. The village is administrated by a sarpanch who is an elected representative of village as per Panchayati raj (India).

== Transport ==
Bhattian railway station is the nearest train station; however, Phillaur Junction train station is 17.4 km away from the village. The village is 47.2 km away from domestic airport in Ludhiana and the nearest international airport is located in Chandigarh also Sri Guru Ram Dass Jee International Airport is the second nearest airport which is 152 km away in Amritsar.
