= Dhanda, Punjab =

Dhanda
- Village
- Location in Punjab, India Dhanda (India)
- Coordinates: 31.1146289°N 75.7443165°E
- Country: India
- State: Punjab
- District: Jalandhar
- Tehsil: Rurka Kalan

Government
  - Type: Panchayat raj
  - Body: Gram panchayat
- Elevation: 246 m (807 ft)

Population (2011)
  - Total: 1,612
- Sex ratio 838/774 ♂/♀

Languages
  - Official: Punjabi
- Time zone: UTC+5:30 (IST)
- PIN: 144409
- Telephone: 01824
- ISO 3166 code: IN-PB
- Vehicle registration: PB- 08
- Post Office: Goraya
- Website: jalandhar.nic.in

Dhanda is a village in Rurka Kalan tehsil in Jalandhar district of Punjab State, India. It is 9 km (5.6 mi) from the postal head office in Goraya, 19 km (12 mi) from Phillaur, 35 km (22 mi) from the district headquarters Jalandhar, and 127 km (79 mi) from the state capital Chandigarh. The village is administrated by a sarpanch who is an elected representative of village as per Panchayati raj.

== Education ==
The village has a Punjabi medium, co-ed upper primary school (GMS Dhanda). The school provides mid-day meal as per Indian Midday Meal Scheme, and the meal prepared in school premises. It was found in 1981.

== Demography ==
According to the report published by Census India in 2011, Dhanda has 343 houses and population of 1612, 838 males and 774 females. The literacy rate of Dhanda is 78.16%, higher than state average of 75.84%. The population of children under the age of 6 years is 147, which is 9.12% of total population of Dhanda, and child sex ratio is approximately 815 females per 1000 males, lower than state average of 846.

As per census 2011, 583 people were engaged in work activities out of the total population of Dhanda, which includes 486 males and 97 females. According to census survey report 2011, 93.14% workers describe their work as main work and 6.86% workers are involved in marginal activity providing livelihood for less than 6 months.

== Transport ==
Goraya railway station is the nearest train station; Phillaur Junction train station is 18 km (11 mi) from the village. The village is 48.6 km (30.2 mi) from the domestic airport in Ludhiana, and the nearest international airport is in Chandigarh. Sri Guru Ram Dass Jee International Airport is the second-nearest airport, 137 km (85 mi) away in Amritsar.
