= Sunar Khurd =

Sunner Khurd
- Village
- Location in Punjab, India Sunner Khurd (India)
- Coordinates: 31.1570877°N 75.6990677°E
- Country: India
- State: Punjab
- District: Jalandhar

Government
  - Type: Panchayat raj
  - Body: Gram panchayat
- Elevation: 240 m (790 ft)

Population (2011)
  - Total: 1,040
- Sex ratio 539/501 ♂/♀

Languages
  - Official: Punjabi
- Time zone: UTC+5:30 (IST)
- PIN: 141311
- ISO 3166 code: IN-PB
- Vehicle registration: PB- 08
- Website: jalandhar.nic.in

Sunner Khurd is a village in Jalandhar district of Punjab State, India. It is located 5.3 km (3.5 miles) from Rurka Kalan, 22 km (14 miles) from Phillaur, 29.8 km from district headquarter Jalandhar and 133 km (83 mi) from state capital Chandigarh. The village is administrated by Sarpanch, as an elected representative of the village.

== Transport ==
Goraya railway station is the nearest train station; however, Phagwara Junction train station is 14 kilometres (8.7 mi) away from the village. The village is 51 km (32 mi) from the domestic airport in Ludhiana, and the nearest international airport is located in Chandigarh. Also Sri Guru Ram Dass Jee International Airport is the second-nearest airport, which is 126 km (78 mi) away in Amritsar.
