= Naker =

Naker may refer to:

- One of the two Islamic angels, Munkar and Nakir, who visit the dead after their funeral
- the European variant of the naqareh, a small Arabic kettle-drum, called nakers in English

== See also ==
- Nagara (disambiguation)
- Nakara (disambiguation)
