= Jaja Kalan =

Jajja Kalan
- Village
- Location in Punjab, India Jajja Kalan (India)
- Coordinates: 31.0914495°N 75.7277393°E
- Country: India
- State: Punjab
- District: Jalandhar

Government
  - Type: Panchayat raj
  - Body: Gram panchayat
- Elevation: 240 m (790 ft)

Population (2011)
  - Total: 979
- Sex ratio 495/484 ♂/♀

Languages
  - Official: Punjabi
- Time zone: UTC+5:30 (IST)
- PIN: 144409
- Telephone: 01824
- ISO 3166 code: IN-PB
- Vehicle registration: PB- 08
- Website: jalandhar.nic.in

Jajja Kalan is a village in Jalandhar district of Punjab State, India. It is 5.1 km (3.2 mi) from Rurka Kalan, 11 km (6.8 mi) from Phillaur, 35.3 km (21.9 mi) from district headquarters Jalandhar and 122 km (76 mi) from the state capital Chandigarh. The village is administrated by Sarpanch, an elected representative of the village.

== Demography ==
According to the report published by Census India in 2011, Jajja Kalan has 214 houses and population of 979, 495 males and 484 females. Literacy rate of Jajja Kalan is 84.41%, higher than state average of 75.84%. The population of children under the age of 6 years is 94, which is 9.60% of total population of Jajja Kalan, and child sex ratio is approximately 649, lower than state average of 846.

Most of the people are from Schedule Caste which constitutes 46.68% of total population in Jajja Kalan. The town does not have any Schedule Tribe population.

As per census 2011, 326 people were engaged in work activities, 298 males and 28 females. 73.01% workers describe their work as main work and 26.99% workers are involved in marginal activity providing livelihood for less than six months.

== Transport ==
Goraya railway station is the nearest train station. Phagwara Junction train station is 19.3 km (12.0 mi) from the village. The village is 40 km (25 mi) from the domestic airport in Ludhiana, and the nearest international airport is in Chandigarh. The Sri Guru Ram Dass Jee International Airport is the second-nearest airport, 135 km (84 mi) away in Amritsar.
