= Ngari (disambiguation) =

Ngari Prefecture is a prefecture of China's Tibet Autonomous Region.

Ngari may also refer to:

- Ngari (fish), a fermented fish product from Manipur
- Shiquanhe (Ngari), the capital of Ngari Prefecture
- Ngari virus, a type of virus
- Idriss Ngari (1946–2025), Gabonese politician and army general

== See also ==
- Nagari (disambiguation)
- Nagri (disambiguation)
- Nigari
