= Nagaram =

Nagaram may refer to:

- Nagaram, Mamidikuduru mandal, Konaseema district, Andhra Pradesh, India
- Nagaram, Bapatla district, Andhra Pradesh, India
- Nagaram, Medchal–Malkajgiri district, Telangana, India
- Nagaram, Suryapet district, Telangana, India
- Nagaram (2007 film), an Indian Malayalam film
- Nagaram (2008 film), an Indian Telugu action film
- Nagaram (2010 film) or Nagaram Marupakkam, an Indian Tamil action film

== See also ==
- Nagara (disambiguation)
- Vijaynagar (disambiguation), including uses of Vizianagaram
