= Jagtar =

Jagtar is a given name. Notable people with the name include:

- Jagtar Singh Hawara (born 1973), Indian Sikh militant
- Jagtar Singh (born 1990), Indian footballer
- Jagtar (poet) (1935–2010), Punjabi poet
- Jagtar Singh Johal, detained activist
- Jagtar Singh Shergill, Canadian political candidate

== See also ==
- Jagtap
