= Panj Dhera =

Allowal ਆਲੌਵਾਲ
- Village
- Location in Punjab, India Allowal (India)
- Coordinates: 31.0068927°N 75.7644546°E
- Country: India
- State: Allowal Punjab
- District: Jalandhar
- Thesil Ludhiana: Phillaur

Government
  - Type: Panchayat raj
  - Body: Gram panchayat
- Elevation: 246 m (807 ft)

Population (2011)
  - Total: 3,535
- Sex ratio 1896/1639 ♂/♀

Languages
  - Official: Punjabi
- Time zone: UTC+5:30 (IST)
- PIN: 144410
- Telephone code: 01826
- ISO 3166 code: IN-PB
- Vehicle registration: PB 37
- Post Office: Phillaur
- Website: jalandhar.nic.in

Allowal (Punjabi: ਆਲੌਵਾਲ) is a medium size village in Phillaur tehsil of Jalandhar District of Punjab State, India. It is located 5 km away from postal head office Phillaur, 14.8 km from Goraya, 48 km from Jalandhar and 111 km from state capital Chandigarh. The village is administrated by a sarpanch who is an elected representative of village as per Panchayati raj (India).

== Demography ==
As of 2011, Allowal had a population of 3535 of which 1896 are males while 1639 are females according to the report published by Census India in 2011. The literacy rate of Panj Dhera is 75.29%, higher than state average of 75.84%. The population of children under the age of 6 years is 419 which is 11.85% of total population of Panj Dhera, and child sex ratio is approximately 862 as compared to Punjab state average of 846. The village has a total number of 690 houses.

Most of the people are from Schedule Caste which constitutes 43.22% of total population in Panj Dhera. The town does not have any Schedule Tribe population so far.

1,179 people were engaged in work activities out of the total population of Panj Dhera which includes 1,048 males and 131 females. According to census survey report 2011, 82.02% of workers describe their work as main work. Of the 1,179 in the working population, 83.4% workers were occupied in main work, 14% were cultivators while 2% were agricultural labourers.

== Transport ==
=== Rail ===
Phillaur Junction is the nearest train station however, Bhatian Railway Station is 11 km away from the village.

=== Air ===
The nearest domestic airport is located 32 km away in Ludhiana and the nearest international airport is located in Chandigarh also Sri Guru Ram Dass Jee International Airport is the second nearest airport which is 142 km away in Amritsar.
