= Ranwan =

- Village
- Location in Punjab, India Ranwan (India)
- Coordinates: 31.0388748°N 75.6829691°E
- Country: India
- State: Punjab
- District: Jalandhar

Government
  - Type: Panchayat raj
  - Body: Gram panchayat
- Elevation: 240 m (790 ft)

Population (2011)
  - Total: 232
- Sex ratio 124/111 ♂/♀

Languages
  - Official: Punjabi
- Time zone: UTC+5:30 (IST)
- PIN: 144036
- ISO 3166 code: IN-PB
- Vehicle registration: PB- 08
- Website: jalandhar.nic.in

Ranwan is a village in Jalandhar district of Punjab State, India. It is located 4.3 km from Bilga, 13.1 km from Phillaur, 40.4 km from district headquarter Jalandhar and 124 km from state capital Chandigarh. The village is administrated by a sarpanch who is an elected representative of village as per Panchayati raj (India).

== Transport ==
Bhattian railway station is the nearest train station; however, Phillaur Junction train station is 12.4 km away from the village. The village is 41.7 km away from domestic airport in Ludhiana and the nearest international airport is located in Chandigarh also Sri Guru Ram Dass Jee International Airport is the second nearest airport which is 136 km away in Amritsar.
