= Dhani Pind =

- Village
- Location in Punjab, India Dhani Pind (India)
- Coordinates: 31.1766049°N 75.655117°E
- Country: India
- State: Punjab
- District: Jalandhar
- Tehsil: Rurka Kalan

Government
  - Type: Panchayat raj
  - Body: Gram panchayat
- Elevation: 240 m (790 ft)

Population (2011)
  - Total: 1,642
- Sex ratio 809/833 ♂/♀

Languages
  - Official: Punjabi
- Time zone: UTC+5:30 (IST)
- PIN: 144633
- Telephone: 01824
- ISO 3166 code: IN-PB
- Vehicle registration: PB- 08
- Post Office: Sarhali
- Website: jalandhar.nic.in

Dhani Pind (or Dhanipind) is a village in Rurka Kalan tehsil in Jalandhar district of Punjab State, India. It is located 8.4 km away from Rurka Kalan, 12 km from Phagwara, 22.7 km from district headquarter Jalandhar and 141 km from state capital Chandigarh. The village is administrated by a sarpanch who is an elected representative of village as per Panchayati raj.

== Education ==
The village has a Punjabi medium, co-ed upper primary with secondary/higher secondary school (GSSS Dhani Pind). The school provide mid-day meal as per Indian Midday Meal Scheme and the meal prepared in school premises and it was found in 1941.

== Demography ==
According to the report published by Census India in 2011, Dhani Pind has a total number of 356 houses and population of 1642 of which include 809 males and 833 females. Literacy rate of Dhani Pind is 79.85%, higher than state average of 75.84%. The population of children under the age of 6 years is 148 which is 9.01% of total population of Dhani Pind, and child sex ratio is approximately 738 lower than state average of 897.

Most of the people are from Schedule Caste which constitutes 34.65% of total population in Dhani Pind. The town does not have any Schedule Tribe population so far.

As per census 2011, 503 people were engaged in work activities out of the total population of Dhani Pind which includes 458 males and 45 females. According to census survey report 2011, 97.61% workers describe their work as main work and 2.39% workers are involved in marginal activity providing livelihood for less than 6 months.

== Transport ==
Phagwara junction railway station is the nearest train station; however, Phillaur Junction train station is 36.5 km away from the village. The village is 66.4 km away from domestic airport in Ludhiana and the nearest international airport is located in Chandigarh also Sri Guru Ram Dass Jee International Airport is the second nearest airport which is 128 km away in Amritsar.
