= Dhinpur =

- Village
- Location in Punjab, India Dhinpur (India)
- Coordinates: 31.1459948°N 75.6960526°E
- Country: India
- State: Punjab
- District: Jalandhar
- Tehsil: Rurka Kalan

Government
  - Type: Panchayat raj
  - Body: Gram panchayat
- Elevation: 240 m (790 ft)

Population (2011)
  - Total: 398
- Sex ratio 200/198 ♂/♀

Languages
  - Official: Punjabi
- Time zone: UTC+5:30 (IST)
- Telephone: 01824
- ISO 3166 code: IN-PB
- Vehicle registration: PB- 08
- Website: jalandhar.nic.in

Dhinpur is a village in Rurka Kalan tehsil in Jalandhar district of Punjab State, India. It is located 3 km away from Rurka Kalan, 20 km from Phillaur, 29.5 km from district headquarters Jalandhar and 132 km from state capital Chandigarh. The village is administrated by a sarpanch who is an elected representative of the village as per Panchayati raj (India).

== Education ==
The village has a Punjabi medium, co-ed primary school (GPS Dhinpur). The school provides mid-day meal as per Indian the Midday Meal Scheme and the meal is prepared on school premises and it was founded in 1995.

== Demography ==
According to the report published by Census India in 2011, Dhinpur has a total number of 80 houses and population of 398 of which include 200 males and 198 females. Literacy rate of Dhinpur is 79.32%, higher than state average of 75.84%. The population of children under the age of 6 years is 45 which is 11.31% of total population of Dhinpur, and child sex ratio is approximately 552 lower than state average of 897.

Most of the people are from Schedule Caste which constitutes 78.14% of the total population in Dhinpur. The town does not have any Schedule Tribe population so far.

As per census 2011, 109 people were engaged in work activities out of the total population of Dhinpur which includes 103 males and 6 females. According to census survey report 2011, 100% workers describe their work as main work and 0% workers are involved in marginal activity providing livelihood for less than 6 months.

== Transport ==
Nurmahal railway station is the nearest train station; however, Phillaur Junction train station is 14.4 km away from the village. The village is 53.4 km away from domestic airport in Ludhiana and the nearest international airport is located in Chandigarh also Sri Guru Ram Dass Jee International Airport is the second nearest airport which is 132 km away in Amritsar.
