= Indna Kalaske =

- Village
- Location in Punjab, India Indna Kalaske (India)
- Coordinates: 31.1693944°N 75.8154434°E
- Country: India
- State: Punjab
- District: Jalandhar

Government
  - Type: Panchayat raj
  - Body: Gram panchayat
- Elevation: 240 m (790 ft)

Population (2011)
  - Total: 1,140
- Sex ratio 571/569 ♂/♀

Languages
  - Official: Punjabi
- Time zone: UTC+5:30 (IST)
- PIN: 144502
- ISO 3166 code: IN-PB
- Vehicle registration: PB- 08
- Website: jalandhar.nic.in

Indna Kalaske is a village in Jalandhar district of Punjab State, India. It is located 10.4 km away from Goraya, 21 km from Phillaur, 31.8 km from district headquarter Jalandhar and 125 km from state capital Chandigarh. The village is administrated by a sarpanch who is an elected representative of village as per Panchayati raj (India).

== Landmarks ==
- Roza Sharif Darbaar Sai Ram Ditte Shah Ji Kaadri

== Demography ==
According to the report published by Census India in 2011, Indna Kalaske has a total number of 229 houses and population of 1140 of which include 571 males and 569 females. Literacy rate of Indna Kalaske is 83.83%, higher than state average of 75.84%. The population of children under the age of 6 years is 101 which is 8.86% of total population of Indna Kalaske, and child sex ratio is approximately 530 lower than state average of 846.

Most of the people are from Schedule Caste which constitutes 70.18% of total population in Indna Kalaske. The town does not have any Schedule Tribe population so far.

As per census 2011, 309 people were engaged in work activities out of the total population of Indna Kalaske which includes 286 males and 23 females. According to census survey report 2011, 74.43% workers describe their work as main work and 25.57% workers are involved in marginal activity providing livelihood for less than 6 months.

== Transport ==
Goraya railway station is the nearest train station; however, Phagwara Junction train station is 9.6 km away from the village. The village is 52.9 km away from domestic airport in Ludhiana and the nearest international airport is located in Chandigarh also Sri Guru Ram Dass Jee International Airport is the second nearest airport which is 126 km away in Amritsar.
