= Jajo Mazara =

- Village
- Location in Punjab, India Jajo Mazara (India)
- Coordinates: 31.1771888°N 75.7817259°E
- Country: India
- State: Punjab
- District: Jalandhar
- Tehsil: Phillaur

Government
  - Type: Panchayat raj
  - Body: Gram panchayat
- Elevation: 246 m (807 ft)

Population (2011)
  - Total: 13
- Sex ratio 12/1 ♂/♀

Languages
  - Official: Punjabi
- Time zone: UTC+5:30 (IST)
- Telephone code: 01826
- ISO 3166 code: IN-PB
- Vehicle registration: PB 37
- Website: jalandhar.nic.in

Jajo Mazara or Jajo Majara is a small size village with a population of only 13 people in Phillaur tehsil of Jalandhar District of Punjab State, India. It is located 11 km away from Goraya, 22.8 km from Phillaur, 30.5 km from district headquarter Jalandhar and 122 km from state capital Chandigarh. The village is administrated by a sarpanch who is an elected representative of village as per Panchayati raj (India).

== Demography ==
As of 2011, Jajo Mazara has a total number of 10 houses and a population of 13, of which 12 are males and only 1 female according to the report published by Census India in 2011. Literacy rate of Jajo Mazara is 30.77%, lower than state average of 75.84%. Child Sex Ratio of the village as per census is 0.

== Transport ==
=== Rail ===
Bhattian train station is the nearest train station however, Goraya Junction Railway Station is 11 km away from the village.

=== Air ===
The nearest domestic airport is located 57 km away in Ludhiana and the nearest international airport is located in Chandigarh also Sri Guru Ram Dass Jee International Airport is the second nearest airport which is 125 km away in Amritsar.
