= Sargundi =

- Village
- Location in Punjab, India Sargundi (India)
- Coordinates: 31.1413636°N 75.7617562°E
- Country: India
- State: Punjab
- District: Jalandhar

Government
  - Type: Panchayat raj
  - Body: Gram panchayat
- Elevation: 240 m (790 ft)

Population (2011)
  - Total: 1,131
- Sex ratio 591/540 ♂/♀

Languages
  - Official: Punjabi
- Time zone: UTC+5:30 (IST)
- PIN: 144409
- Telephone: 01824
- ISO 3166 code: IN-PB
- Post Office: Goraya
- Website: jalandhar.nic.in

Sargundi is a village in Jalandhar district of Punjab State, India. It is located 3.8 km (walking distance) from postal head office in Goraya, 16.8 km from Phillaur, 38 km from district headquarter Jalandhar and 126 km from state capital Chandigarh. The village is administrated by a sarpanch who is an elected representative of village as per Panchayati raj.

== Transport ==
Goraya railway station is the nearest train station; however, Phillaur Junction train station is 16.2 km away from the village. The village is 45 km away from domestic airport in Ludhiana and the nearest international airport is located in Chandigarh also Sri Guru Ram Dass Jee International Airport is the second nearest airport which is 131 km away in Amritsar.

== Population ==
Today Sargundi village is known for tayi bachni Sargundi village. In 2022 the total population of Sargundi village is about 3000 people.

== Youngsters Achievements ==
Younger residents of Sargundi village have completed higher education. Deepak Dablar earned a BSc in IT from Lovely Professional University and works as an SEO Manager for Multichannel Creative, a UK-based IT company.

== Development ==
Sargundii village has undergone a lot of changes in the last 7 years as there has been a lot of government in this village as roads have become paved. All the streets of the village are fitted with anti-locks and the water which is in the house is the wastewater, the sewerage has been put in the streets. This sewerage is directly linked with the pond that is situated out of the village.

Solar street led lights have been installed on every street corner, now people feel safe to walk out of their homes at night.

== Gurudwara Sahib ==
There are three gurudwara sahib located in the village.
