= Vijay Nagar, Ghaziabad =

Vijay Nagar विजय नगर
- Suburb
- Country: India
- State: Uttar Pradesh
- District: Ghaziabad

Government
  - Body: Ghaziabad Development Authority

Languages
  - Hindi Official: Hindi
- Time zone: UTC+5:30 (IST)
- PIN: 201009
- Telephone code: 0120
- Nearest city: Noida
- Lok Sabha constituency: Ghaziabad
- Civic agency: Ghaziabad Development Authority

Vijay Nagar is a major residential, industrial and commercial area in Ghaziabad, Uttar Pradesh, India. It was developed with assistance of the Ghaziabad Development Authority. The suburb is located at the junction of Noida, Greater Noida, Crossings Republik, Pratap Vihar and Indirapuram. Vijay Nagar is known for its educational institutes, industrial areas, the Ghaziabad Junction Railway Station, the Meerut Expressway, NH-24 and the Vishwakarma Road. The area has witnessed rampant growth in infrastructure and civic development. Vijay Nagar is closely linked with the adjoining Pratap Vihar area having a residential area, upcoming real estate projects and the Santosh Medical & Dental College, a part of Santosh University.The adjoining Bhur Bharat Nagar is close to Ghaziabad Railway Station, the nearest railway station that serves this area.

The residential and commercial areas are divided into two regions: Old Vijay Nagar and New Vijay Nagar. Other localities are divided into a number of sectors and blocks. The more prominent ones include Sector-9 which has several blocks ranging from A to K and Sector-12. Other districts include Shivpuri, Ambedkar Nagar, Sarvodaya Nagar, Maya Puri, UPSIDC industrial area and Ispat Nagar. The area is spread across NH-24 and the upcoming 19 km-long Delhi–Meerut Expressway between UP Gate and Dasna which is scheduled to be completed by 2020. The project is facing delays. An 8 km stretch of Delhi-Meerut Expressway from UP Gate to Vijay Nagar will open to traffic in March 2019

== Religion ==
The area has several temples, mosques and other religious places.

- Shiv Mandir in Sector-9, New Vijay Nagar
- Shiv Mandir in Old Vijay Nagar
- Gurudwara near Ghaziabad Railway Station
- Sheetla Mata Mandir in Shivpuri.
- Madina Masjid in Mawai sector 9 Vijay Nagar.
- Shree Sanatan Dharm Mandir in Bhoor Bharat Nagar.
- Shani Mandir in sector 9 Vijay Nagar.

== Banks ==
Prominent Banks are Bank of Baroda, State Bank of India, Punjab National Bank, HDFC and ATMs in the area are: HDFC, Axis Bank, DCB Bank, ICICI, Punjab National Bank

== Landmarks ==
Some important landmarks in the area are: Samraat Chowk, Overhead Water Tank, Chanakya Chowk, Vijay Nagar Police Station, Mawai, and Ghaziabad Railway Station.

== Developments ==
- The new railroad bridge in Ghaziabad's Dhobi Ghat is set to be finished by 2018.
- The crore drinking water supply project for six wards of Vijay Nagar.
- The Ghaziabad Municipal Corporation recently signed off on door-to-door collection vehicles for the daily solid waste collection from the 13 residential wards in the city.
- The Delhi-Meerut Expressway work was affected by the ban on construction work by Supreme Court order, even though NHAI was fined Rs. 26 lakh for continuation of work at few sites.

== Transportation ==
Local E-Rickshaw, Sharing Auto and Taxi: An auto rickshaw runs through the area on a sharing basis. People can also get a ride from the NH-24 highway (opposite 1-India Family Mart) or near the Vijay Nagar Police Station or "Thana" or directly from the Vijay Nagar side of the Ghaziabad Junction Railway Station to any of the nearby or Delhi NCR locations in Noida, Greater Noida, Indirapuram, Crossings Republik etc.

Local Train or EMU The area has an Electric multiple unit (EMU), a train configuration often used for sub-urban travel. Similar to EMU services in Mumbai (popularly called Local), Delhi - Ghaziabad EMU is a feeder train to the main line trains that stop at many of the prominent stations in Delhi, including the New Delhi Railway Station, Delhi Junction Railway Station, Hazrat Nizamuddin Railway Station, Sadar Bazar Railway Station and Anand Vihar Terminal Railway Station.

Upcoming Metro Station The proposed expansion of metro expansion in Ghaziabad has included Vijay Nagar along NH-24.Nearest Metro station at present is Saheed Sthal Metro station शहीद स्थल मेट्रो स्टेशन which is about 4.2km also Noida Sector 62 metro Station which about 8.1km.

== Notable people ==
- V. K. Singh
- Atul Garg
