= Jaitowal =

- Village
- Location in Punjab, India Jaitowal (India)
- Coordinates: 31.0965136°N 75.6974143°E
- Country: India
- State: Punjab
- District: Jalandhar

Government
  - Type: Panchayat raj
  - Body: Gram panchayat
- Elevation: 240 m (790 ft)

Population (2011)
  - Total: 328
- Sex ratio 162/166 ♂/♀

Languages
  - Official: Punjabi
- Time zone: UTC+5:30 (IST)
- Telephone: 01824
- ISO 3166 code: IN-PB
- Vehicle registration: PB- 08
- Website: jalandhar.nic.in

Jaitowal is a village in Jalandhar district of Punjab State, India. It is located 3.5 km away from Rurka Kalan, 14.4 km from Phillaur, 33.8 km from district headquarter Jalandhar and 124 km from state capital Chandigarh. The village is administrated by a sarpanch, who is an elected representative.

== Demography ==
According to the report published by Census India in 2011, Jaitowal has a total number of 72 houses and population of 328 of which include 162 males and 166 females. Literacy rate of Jaitowal is 80.81%, higher than state average of 75.84%. The population of children under the age of 6 years is 31 which is 9.45% of total population of Jaitowal, and child sex ratio is approximately 1067 higher than state average of 846.

Most of the people are from Schedule Caste which constitutes 4.57% of total population in Jaitowal. The town does not have any Schedule Tribe population so far.

As per census 2011, 108 people were engaged in work activities out of the total population of Jaitowal which includes 101 males and 7 females. According to census survey report 2011, 99.07% workers describe their work as main work and 0.93% workers are involved in marginal activity providing livelihood for less than 6 months.

== Transport ==
Goraya railway station is the nearest train station; however, Phagwara Junction train station is 20 km away from the village. The village is 44.1 km away from domestic airport in Ludhiana and the nearest international airport is located in Chandigarh also Sri Guru Ram Dass Jee International Airport is the second nearest airport which is 129 km away in Amritsar.
