= Mathadda Khurd =

- Village
- Location in Punjab, India Mathadda Khurd (India)
- Coordinates: 31.0717746°N 75.7465859°E
- Country: India
- State: Punjab
- District: Jalandhar

Government
  - Type: Panchayat raj
  - Body: Gram panchayat
- Elevation: 240 m (790 ft)

Population (2011)
  - Total: 1,325
- Sex ratio 671/654 ♂/♀

Languages
  - Official: Punjabi
- Time zone: UTC+5:30 (IST)
- PIN: 144409
- ISO 3166 code: IN-PB
- Website: jalandhar.nic.in

Mathadda Khurd is a village in the Jalandhar district of Punjab State, India. It is located 8 km from Phillaur, 38.2 km from district headquarter Jalandhar and 129 km from state capital Chandigarh. The village is administrated by a sarpanch who is an elected representative of village as per Panchayati raj (India).

== Demography ==
According to the report published by Census India in 2011, Mathadda Khurd has a total number of 287 houses and population of 1325 of which include 671 males and 654 females. Literacy rate of Mathadda Khurd is 77.25%, higher than state average of 75.84%. The population of children under the age of 6 years is 103 which is 7.77% of total population of Mathadda Khurd, and child sex ratio is approximately 776 lower than state average of 846.

Most of the people are from Schedule Caste which constitutes 44.15% of total population in Mathadda Khurd. The town does not have any Schedule Tribe population so far.

As per census 2011, 403 people were engaged in work activities out of the total population of Mathadda Khurd which includes 368 males and 35 females. According to census survey report 2011, 94.54% workers describe their work as main work and 5.46% workers are involved in marginal activity providing livelihood for less than 6 months.

== Transport ==
Bhattian railway station is the nearest train station; however, Phagwara Junction train station is 20.7 km away from the village. The village is 36.6 km away from domestic airport in Ludhiana and the nearest international airport is located in Chandigarh also Sri Guru Ram Dass Jee International Airport is the second nearest airport which is 137 km away in Amritsar.
