= Rajpura, Phillaur =

Rajpura
- Village
- Country: India
- State: Punjab
- District: Jalandhar

Languages
  - Official: Punjabi
- Time zone: UTC+5:30 (IST)

Rajpura is a village in Phillaur, a city in the district Jalandhar of Indian state of Punjab.

== Geography ==
Rajpura lies on the Goraya-Masani Banga road which is almost 1 km from it. The nearest railway station to Rajpura is Goraya railway station at a distance of 8 km.

== Post code ==
Rajpura Post office is Apra.
