= Kutbewal =

- Village
- Location in Punjab, India Kutbewal (India)
- Coordinates: 31.0941006°N 75.770262°E
- Country: India
- State: Punjab
- District: Jalandhar

Government
  - Type: Panchayat raj
  - Body: Gram panchayat
- Elevation: 240 m (790 ft)

Population (2011)
  - Total: 792
- Sex ratio 405/387 ♂/♀

Languages
  - Official: Punjabi
- Time zone: UTC+5:30 (IST)
- PIN: 144409
- Telephone: 01824
- ISO 3166 code: IN-PB
- Vehicle registration: PB- 08
- Post office: Goraya
- Website: jalandhar.nic.in

Kutbewal is a village in Jalandhar district of Punjab State, India. It is located 4 km away from postal head office in Goraya, 14.2 km from Nurmahal, 40.4 km from district headquarter Jalandhar and 122 km from state capital Chandigarh. The village is administrated by a sarpanch, who is an elected representative.

== Demography ==
According to the report published by Census India in 2011, Kutbewal has a total number of 159 houses and population of 792 of which include 405 males and 387 females. The literacy rate of Kutbewal is 79.94%, higher than state average of 75.84%. The population of children under the age of 6 years is 74 which is 9.34% of total population of Kutbewal, and child sex ratio is approximately 1056 higher than state average of 846.

Most of the people are from Schedule Caste which constitutes 88.13% of total population in Kutbewal. The town does not have any Schedule Tribe population so far.

As per census 2011, 237 people were engaged in work activities out of the total population of Kutbewal which includes 221 males and 16 females. According to census survey report 2011, 100% workers describe their work as main work and 0% workers are involved in marginal activity providing livelihood for less than 6 months.

== Transport ==
Goraya railway station is the nearest train station however, Phagwara Junction train station is 15 km away from the village. The village is 43.5 km away from domestic airport in Ludhiana and the nearest international airport is located in Chandigarh also Sri Guru Ram Dass Jee International Airport is the second nearest airport which is 132 km away in Amritsar.
