= Jhungian Mahansingh =

- Village
- Location in Punjab, India Jhungian Mahansingh (India)
- Coordinates: 31.0255731°N 75.8367002°E
- Country: India
- State: Punjab
- District: Jalandhar
- Tehsil: Phillaur

Government
  - Type: Panchayat raj
  - Body: Gram panchayat
- Elevation: 246 m (807 ft)

Population (2011)
  - Total: 201
- Sex ratio 105/96 ♂/♀

Languages
  - Official: Punjabi
- Time zone: UTC+5:30 (IST)
- PIN: 144410
- Telephone code: 01826
- ISO 3166 code: IN-PB
- Vehicle registration: PB 37
- Post office: Phillaur
- Website: jalandhar.nic.in

Jhungian Mahansingh is a village in Phillaur tehsil of Jalandhar District of Punjab State, India. It is located 12 km from Nagar, 7 km from postal head office Phillaur, 52 km from Jalandhar and 131 km from state capital Chandigarh. The village is administrated by a sarpanch who is an elected representative of village as per Panchayati raj (India).

== Caste ==
The village has schedule caste (SC) constitutes 67.16% of total population of the village and it doesn't have any Schedule Tribe (ST) population.

== Transport ==
=== Rail ===
Phillaur Junction is the nearest train station; however, Bhatian Railway Station is 16 km away from the village.

=== Air ===
The nearest domestic airport is located 40 km away in Ludhiana and the nearest international airport is located in Chandigarh also a second nearest international airport is 147 km away in Amritsar.
