= Angkor (disambiguation) =

Angkor or Ankor may refer to:

- Angkor, the site of a series of capital cities of the Khmer empire
  - Angkor Wat, temple complex of Angkor in Siem Reap, Cambodia
- Angkor Airways
- Ankor, Somalia
- Ankor (band), a Spanish alternative metal band
- Angkor: Heart of an Asian Empire, a 1989 illustrated book by Bruno Dagens

== See also ==
- Negara (disambiguation)
- Nagara (disambiguation)
- Nagar (disambiguation)
