= Theatre state =

Political state directed towards the performance of drama and ritual

In political anthropology, a theatre state is a political state directed towards the performance of drama and ritual rather than towards more conventional ends such as warfare and welfare. Power in a theatre state is exercised through spectacle. The term, coined by Clifford Geertz (1926–2006) in 1980 in reference to political practice in the nineteenth-century Balinese kingdoms, has since expanded in usage. Hunik Kwon and Byung-Ho Chung, for example, regard contemporary North Korea as a theatre state. In Geertz's original usage, the concept of the theatre state contests the notion that precolonial society can be analysed in the conventional discourse of Oriental despotism.

In 1966, Ben Anderson, a scholar of Indonesian culture, explicitly compared the Japanese occupation of Indonesia to Kabuki. Anderson argued that the Japanese government used the elements of Kabuki, including, "mysterious silences, lightening changes of mood, terrifying grimaces, spectacular acrobatics and sumptuous pageantry" to control the Indonesians.

== See also ==
- Negara: The Theatre State in Nineteenth-Century Bali
- Bread and circuses
- Military parades in North Korea
- Byzantinism
- Divide and rule
