= Crossings Republik =

Crossings Republik Township
- Integrated Township
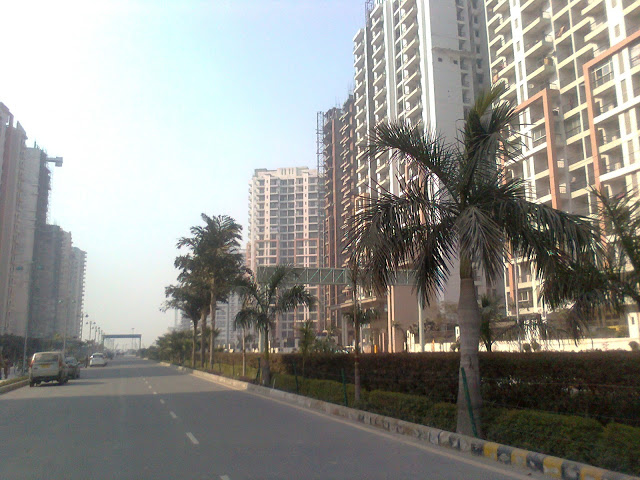
- Crossing Republik Ghaziabad on NH 24

- Location in Uttar Pradesh, India
- Coordinates: 28.63024°N 77.43486°E
- Country: India
- State: Uttar Pradesh
- District: Ghaziabad
- Elevation: 212 m (696 ft)

Languages
  - Official: Hindi, English
- Time zone: UTC+5:30 (IST)
- PIN: 201016 (Newly assigned Pin Code exclusively for Crossing Republik Township linked to a dedicated Post Office inside the Galleria Market on the 2nd floor)
- Telephone code: 0120
- Nearest city: Noida, Ghaziabad, Greater Noida, Delhi, Bulandshahr

Crossings Republik Township is an integrated city project in India, situated on National Highway 24/9 (Delhi Meerut Expressway) in Ghaziabad, Uttar Pradesh stretching towards Greater Noida. Built at a cost of ₹60 billion (US$620 million) and aimed to cater to 200,000 residents., it is one of the two big sub cities of Ghaziabad, along with Indirapuram. The high-rise township spread over 360 acres, covering village Dundahera where land acquisition took place from 2004 to 2009.

== Design ==
The survey feasibility report and marketing was done by CB Richard Ellis, and architect Hafeez Contractor worked on architectural consultancy.
