= Jagtar (poet) =

Dr. Jagtar
- Born: Rajgomal
- Died: Jalandhar
- Education: Phd. in Literature, Panjab University
- Occupations: Writer; poet; teacher
- Known for: Punjabi Poetry

Signature
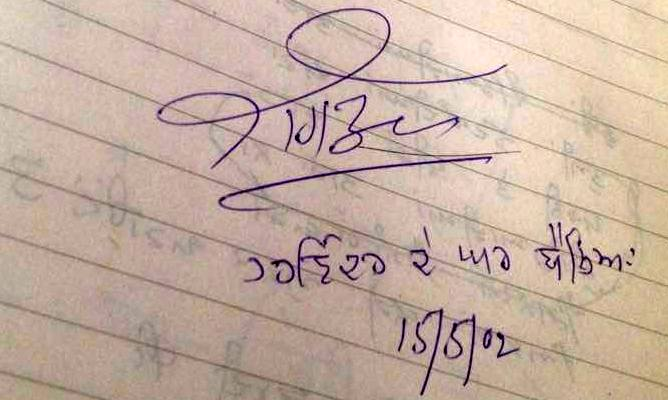

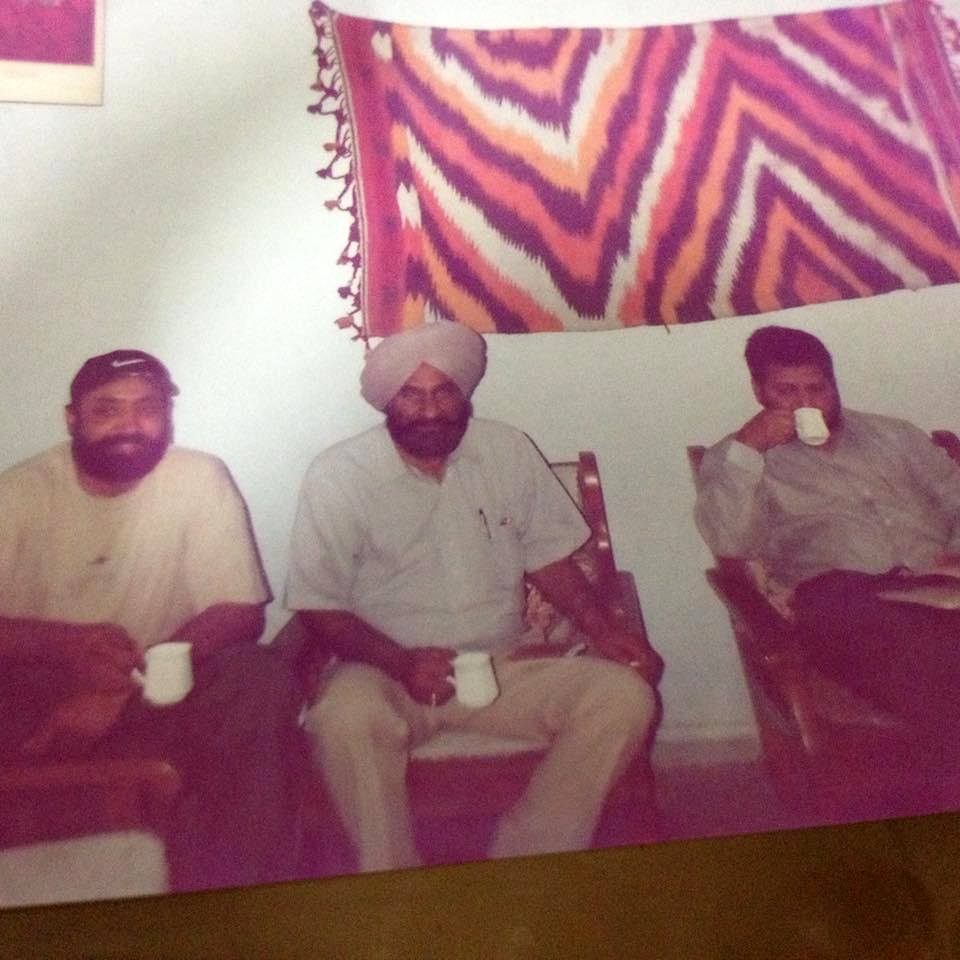
Punjabi language writers Dr. Jagtar, (middle), Harvinder (left) and Surjit Judge ( right)

Jagtar (23 March 1935 – 30 March 2010) was a Punjabi poet. He was widely credited for being a stickler for meter and rhyme. He was very popular among the politically conscious Punjabi readers having left-wing leanings. In the early period of his popularity he was known by his pen name Jagtar “Papiha” which he later dropped.

== Life ==
Jagtar was born at Rajgomal, Jallandhar district, in Punjab Province, British India. In the early 1970s he attended Panjab University to do his masters in Punjabi literature and did his Ph.D. on the critical study of Punjabi poetry in Pakistan from 1947 to 1972. He served as a college lecturer for most of his life. He wrote 32 books.

== Works ==
- Ruttan-ranglian (1957)
- Talkhian ranginian (1960)
- Dudh pathiri (1961)
- Adhura manukh(1967)
- Lahu de naksh (1973)
- Chhangya rukh (1976)
- Sheeshe da jungle (1980)
- Janjriyan vich ghiriya Samundar (1985)
- Chunakri Sham (1990)
- Jugnu Deeva Te Dariya (1992)
- Akhan Waliya Paidan (1999)
- Prawesh Dwar (2003)
- Mom de Lok (2006)
- Pashāwara toṃ Sindha taka : safaranāmā
