= Nakara =

Nakara may refer to:

- Nakara (drum) or nagada/nagara, an Indian musical instrument
- Nakara (martial art), a traditional martial art in the culture of Kiribati
- Nakara, Northern Territory, a suburb of Darwin, Australia
- Nakara people, a group of Indigenous Australians
  - Nakkara language

== See also ==
- Nagara (disambiguation)
- Naker (disambiguation)
- Nakar, medieval Indian poet
