= Rajgomal =

- Village
- Location in Punjab, India Rajgomal (India)
- Coordinates: 31.1363497°N 75.6833231°E
- Country: India
- State: Punjab
- District: Jalandhar

Government
  - Type: Panchayat raj
  - Body: Gram panchayat
- Elevation: 240 m (790 ft)

Population (2011)
  - Total: 752
- Sex ratio 389/363 ♂/♀

Languages
  - Official: Punjabi
- Time zone: UTC+5:30 (IST)
- PIN: 144031
- Telephone: 01824
- ISO 3166 code: IN-PB IN-PB
- Post Office: Rurka Kalan
- Website: jalandhar.nic.in

Rajgomal is a village in Jalandhar district of Punjab State, India. It is located 2.5 km from postal head office in Rurka Kalan, 13.7 km from Goraya, 29.1 km from district headquarter Jalandhar and 134 km from state capital Chandigarh. The village is administrated by a sarpanch who is an elected representative of village as per Panchayati raj (India).

== Transport ==
Goraya railway station is the nearest train station; however, Phillaur Junction train station is 19 km away from the village. The village is 51.4 km away from domestic airport in Ludhiana and the nearest international airport is located in Chandigarh also Sri Guru Ram Dass Jee International Airport is the second nearest airport which is 129 km away in Amritsar.
