= Pasla =

- Village
- Location in Punjab, India Pasla (India)
- Coordinates: 31.1006865°N 75.6801661°E
- Country: India
- State: Punjab
- District: Jalandhar

Government
  - Type: Panchayat raj
  - Body: Gram panchayat
- Elevation: 240 m (790 ft)

Population (2011)
  - Total: 2,878
- Sex ratio 1512/1366 ♂/♀

Languages
  - Official: Punjabi
- Time zone: UTC+5:30 (IST)
- PIN: 144037
- ISO 3166 code: IN-PB
- Website: jalandhar.nic.in

Pasla is a village in Jalandhar district of Punjab State, India. It is located 12.4 km from Nurmahal, 3.3 km from Rurka Kalan, 30.9 km from district headquarter Jalandhar and 127 km from state capital Chandigarh. The village is administrated by a sarpanch who is an elected representative of village as per Panchayati raj (India).

== Transport ==
Nurmahal railway station is the nearest train station; however, Phillaur Junction train station is 13 km away from the village. The village is 45.3 km away from domestic airport in Ludhiana and the nearest international airport is located in Chandigarh also Sri Guru Ram Dass Jee International Airport is the second nearest airport which is 123 km away in Amritsar.it also has its own bus station.

== Specialty ==
Village Pasla is known for its baba Ami chand's dargah. many festivals are organised in this village. Especially the dussehra. Many villages get together for this festival and also every year a big carnival is held in dargah.

Pasla also has a temple and gurdwaras. Pasla has a quite big playground.

== Education ==
The village has its own school which has over 12 classes. The school includes a garden with playground and swing, which is open to the public.

== Facilities ==
Pasla has a hospital and many pharmacies and grocery shops. A bank is also near the village with an atm facility.
