= Nagar, Bogra =

Village in Bangladesh

Coordinates: 24°52′N 89°24′E

Nagar is a village in Shajahanpur upzilla in the Bogra district of Bangladesh. It is situated on the bank of the river of Karotoa. There are 27 hamlets in the village, including Rajarampur, Polipalash and Boronagar.
