= Sang Dhesian =

- Village
- Location in Punjab, India Sang Dhesian (India)
- Coordinates: 31°07′25″N 75°44′35″E
- Country: India
- State: Punjab
- District: Jalandhar
- Elevation: 234 m (768 ft)

Population (2007)
  - Total: 2,222
  - Density: 267/km^{2} (690/sq mi)

Languages
  - Official: Punjabi
- Time zone: UTC+5:30 (IST)
- PIN: 144 409
- Telephone code: 91-1826
- Vehicle registration: PB 37
- Sex ratio: 986 ♂/♀
- Literacy: 51%%

Sang Dhesian (Dhesian Sang) is a village in Phillaur tahsil of Jalandhar district of Punjab state of India known for Baba Sang ji Gurdwara.

== History ==
Sang Dhesian village is named after Baba Sang Ji who was very devoted disciple of Guru Arjun Dev The Fifth Sikh Master.

== Geography ==
Sang Dhesian is located in Punjab. It has an average elevation of 234 metres (768 feet). Sang Dhesian is 310 km from Delhi and 42 km from Jalandhar. The nearest railway station is 4 km away from Sang Dhesian at Goraya.

== Village ==
The population of Sang Dhesian is around 2500. Most of the villagers are engaged in agriculture. The major crops cultivated by farmers are wheat, paddy, potato, maize, sunflower and sugarcane. Sang Dhesian village has education facilities including Guru Nanak Khalsa Girls College Baba Sang Dhesian at Goraya, just outside the village. Every year on 14th of Chet month a cultural mela is held near Gurdwara in the honor of Baba Sang Ji.

== Climate ==
Sang Dhesian village has a humid subtropical climate with hot summers and cool winters. Summers last from April To June, the rain season is from July to October and winter is from November to February. AverageTemperatures in summer vary from around 48 degrees Celsius to around 25 degrees Celsius. Average winter temperatures vary from highs of 19 degrees Celsius to lows of -5 degrees Celsius. The climate is on the whole dry except during the brief south-west monsoon season during July–August. The average annual rainfall is around 70 cm.

== Baba Sang Ji Gurdwara ==
Sang Dhesian village is known for 'Baba Sang Ji Gurdwara' which is one of the most famous Gurdwara in India. Baba Sang Gurdwara is 125 feet high and 90 feet long. Devotees around the area helped to build Gurdwara. Approximately 25 ounces of gold was donated by devotees to the Gurdwara. The foundation for the Gurdwara was laid by Sardar Resham Singh Dhesi. Baba Sang Ji Gurdwara has been a congregation since 1991. Satellite view of Baba Sang Gurdwara is located in Punjab.

== Sang Dhesian non resident Indians ==
Thousands of people from the Jalandhar district have migrated abroad and settled in countries like Canada and the UK. To facilitate financial transactions, the Punjab government opened a NRI Bank branch office at Goraya.
