= Vijoy Nagar =

- village
- Country: India
- State: Andaman and Nicobar Islands
- District: Nicobar
- Tehsil: Great Nicobar

Population (2011)
  - Total: 100
- Time zone: UTC+5:30 (IST)
- 2011 census code: 645194

Vijoy Nagar is a village in the Nicobar district of Andaman and Nicobar Islands, India. It is located in the Great Nicobar tehsil.

It comes under the administration of Laxmi Nagar panchayat.

== Demographics ==
According to the 2011 census of India, Vijoy Nagar has 12 households. The effective literacy rate (i.e. the literacy rate of population excluding children aged 6 and below) is 66.33%.

Demographics (2011 Census)
	Total	Male	Female
Population	100	95	5
Children aged below 6 years	2	0	2
Scheduled caste	0	0	0
Scheduled tribe	0	0	0
Literates	65	63	2
Workers (all)	95	95	0
Main workers (total)	95	95	0
Main workers: Cultivators	5	5	0
Main workers: Agricultural labourers	12	12	0
Main workers: Household industry workers	0	0	0
Main workers: Other	78	78	0
Marginal workers (total)	0	0	0
Marginal workers: Cultivators	0	0	0
Marginal workers: Agricultural labourers	0	0	0
Marginal workers: Household industry workers	0	0	0
Marginal workers: Others	0	0	0
Non-workers	5	0	5
