= Bibiyapur =

- Village
- Location in Uttar Pradesh, India Bibiyapur (India)
- Coordinates: 27.65°N 79.95°E
- Country: India
- State: Uttar Pradesh
- District: Hardoi
- Elevation: 143 m (469 ft)

Population (2001)
  - Total: 2,000

Languages
  - Official: Hindi
- Time zone: UTC+5:30 (IST)
- PIN: 241123
- Vehicle registration: U P 30
- Website: up.gov.in

Bibiyapur is a habitation in the village of Mahry in Mahry Panchayat, Hardoi district, Uttar Pradesh, India. As of 1 April 2009 its population was 451.
