= Nagara =

Nagara may refer to:

== Places ==
- Nagara (ancient city), an ancient city in Afghanistan
- Nagara, Karnataka, India
- Nagara, Chiba, a town in Japan
- Nagara River, a river in Japan
- La Nagara, Golf Course located in Vancouver, Canada. Home of the 2023 Twinsie Invitational.

== People with the surname ==
- Fujiwara no Nagara (802–856), Japanese statesman, courtier and politician
- Masashi Nagara (born 1977), Japanese fencer
- Nagara family, a rabbinical family (includes a list of people with the name)

== Other uses ==
- Nagara (drum), a type of drum played in India
- Naqareh or nagara, a type of drum played in the Middle East
- Nagara (moth), a genus of moth
- Nagara architecture, a style of Hindu temple architecture
- Nagari, or Nagara, several related writing systems of South Asia
- Nagara language, an Australian language
- Nagara people, an Australian ethnic group
- Japanese cruiser Nagara, a Japanese World War II light cruiser
  - Nagara-class cruiser, a Japanese World War II light cruiser class

== See also ==
- Nagar (disambiguation)
- Nagaram (disambiguation)
- Nagari (disambiguation)
- Negara (disambiguation)
- Nakara (disambiguation)
- Angkor (disambiguation)
- Niagara (disambiguation)
- Nagarathar, an Indian caste
