= Negara: The Theatre State in Nineteenth-Century Bali =

1980 book written by Clifford Geertz

- Author: Clifford Geertz
- Language: English
- Publisher: Princeton University Press
- Publication date: 1980
- ISBN: 0-691-05316-2 (first edition, hardcover)
- Dewey Decimal: 320.95986
- LC Class: DS647.B2 G38

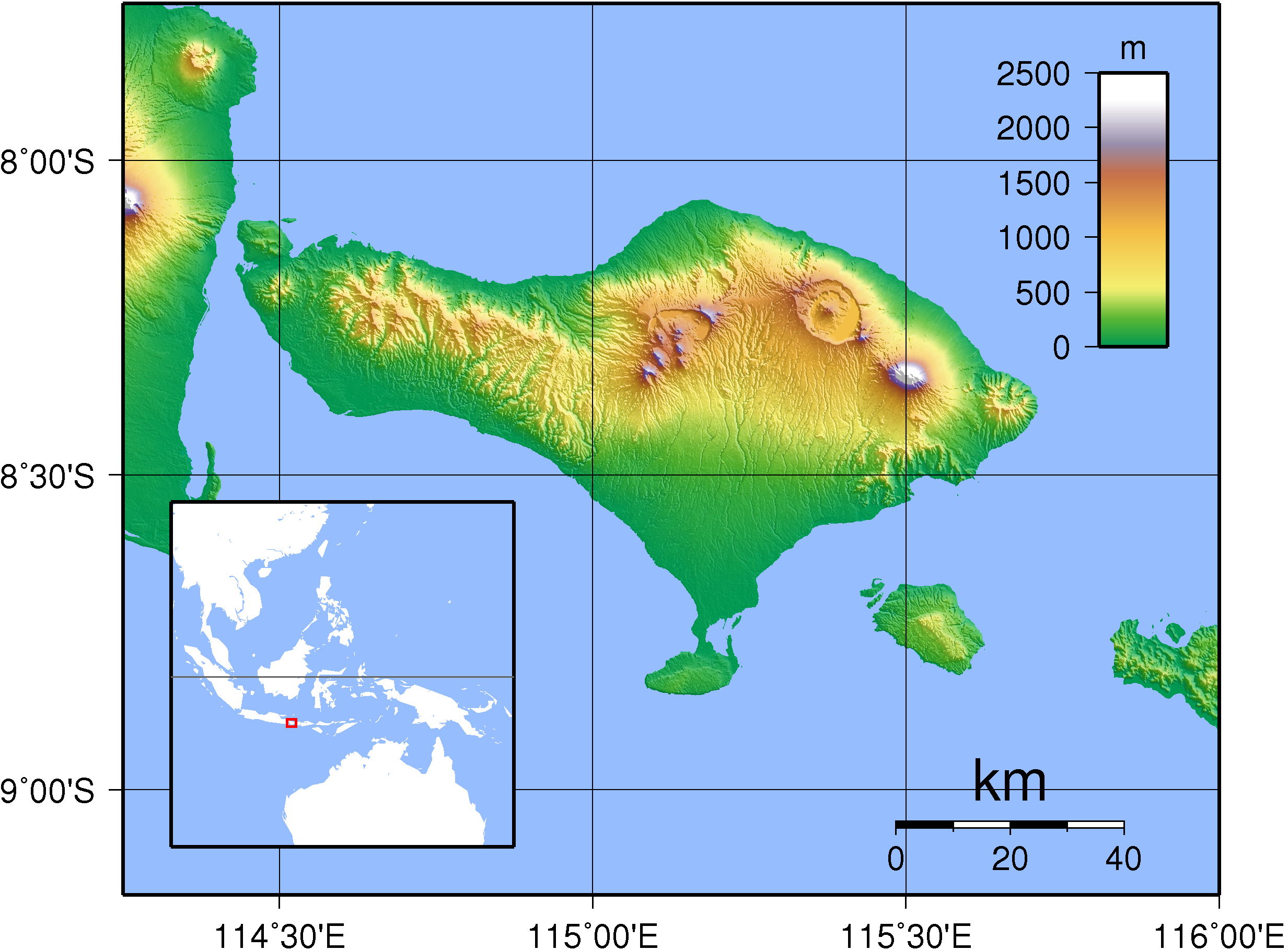
Topographic map of Bali

Negara: The Theatre State in Nineteenth-Century Bali is a 1980 book written by anthropologist Clifford Geertz. Geertz argues that the pre-colonial Balinese state was not a "hydraulic bureaucracy" nor an oriental despotism, but rather, an organized spectacle. The noble rulers of the island were less interested in administering the lives of the Balinese than in dramatizing their rank and enhance political superiority through large public rituals and ceremonies. These cultural processes did not support the state, he argues, but were the state.

It is perhaps most clear in what was, after all, the master image of political life: kingship. The whole of the negara - court life, the traditions that organized it, the extractions that supported it, the privileges that accompanied it - was essentially directed toward defining what power was; and what power was what kings were. Particular kings came and went, 'poor passing facts' anonymized in titles, immobilized in ritual, and annihilated in bonfires. But what they represented, the model-and-copy conception of order, remained unaltered, at least over the period we know much about. The driving aim of higher politics was to construct a state by constructing a king. The more consummate the king, the more exemplary the centre. The more exemplary the centre, the more actual the realm.

Geertz used the Balinese case to develop an abstract model of the Theatre state applicable to all the South East Asian Indic polities. To succinctly summarize his theory, "Power served pomp, not pomp power." Other anthropologists have contested the ahistorical, static nature of the model. They point out that he has depoliticized a political institution by emphasizing culture while ignoring its material base.

== Background ==
Clifford Geertz was an American anthropologist who is remembered for his influence on the practice of symbolic anthropology, and who was considered "for three decades...the single most influential cultural anthropologist in the United States."

Geertz used this model to provide "an alternate conception of what politics is about"; to advance an approach to history as a succession of broad cultural schemata; and to contribute to the cultural dimension of the discussion on Southeast Asian polities.

== Synopsis ==
The book is a consideration of many elements of Balinese life, such as cremation ceremonies, that many would not consider a part of a state apparatus. In order to understand why cremation ceremonies should be so key to the "Theatre state" Geertz provides a detailed description of Balinese social organization in its own cultural terms. Particular aspects of Balinese life have been over-emphasized, according to some, to accommodate his model. Those aspects focus, in particular, on the role of irrigation.

=== The Ruling Class ===
For most of the nineteenth century, there were seven principal kingdoms, of which Klungkung was considered the oldest and most sacred. The others were Tabanan, Badung, Gianyar, Karengasem, Bangli, and Mengwi. They were primarily located on the plain on the south side of the island. Each of the kingdoms controlled a riverine valley and hence the water supply required for rice irrigation.

The kingdoms of Bali were said to have been founded by Javanese refugees from the Hinduized kingdom of Majapahit which had just fallen to Muslim invaders. They, in turn, invaded in 1352 at Gelgel and established an Indic state based upon the caste system.

==== The caste system ====
The caste system only loosely resembled the caste system in India. The three noble castes were referred to as "triwangsa," (three peoples), the "insiders" (wong jero) as opposed to the commoners (wong jaba, outsiders). MacRae argues that this emphasis on the Indic heritage of Bali is overdrawn, and points out that Geertz himself admits that caste is a misnomer in Bali, and "that the Indic surface of Balinese political institutions has acted to inhibit a comparative reference eastwards... towards the Pacific."

==== The dadia ====
The basic unit of the triwangsa castes was the "noble house" or dadia. The commoners, for the most part, lacked these corporate kin groups. The dadia was a kinship group whose leadership passed through the line of the eldest male, from father to son. Younger sons remained identified with the group, lived nearby, but had less status. The children of the core line also had more status than the children of the junior lines. Geertz refers to this as the principle of "sinking status." Each of these junior lines could potentially sever itself and form an independent dadia. This process of schism formed the internal politics within the royal houses, as distinct from political conflict between houses. The status differentials both within and between houses made patron-client relations the basic idiom of politics. These client relationships were especially important between castes, linking the priestly caste (padanda) with noble houses in a teacher-disciple tie.

Besides these patron-client ties within dadia, alliances also formed between dadia in different kingdoms. These alliances were frequently codified in treaties, although the issues they covered seemed "designed more to codify the pretexts upon which alliances could be broken than to establish the bases upon which they could be built."

=== The Village and the State ===
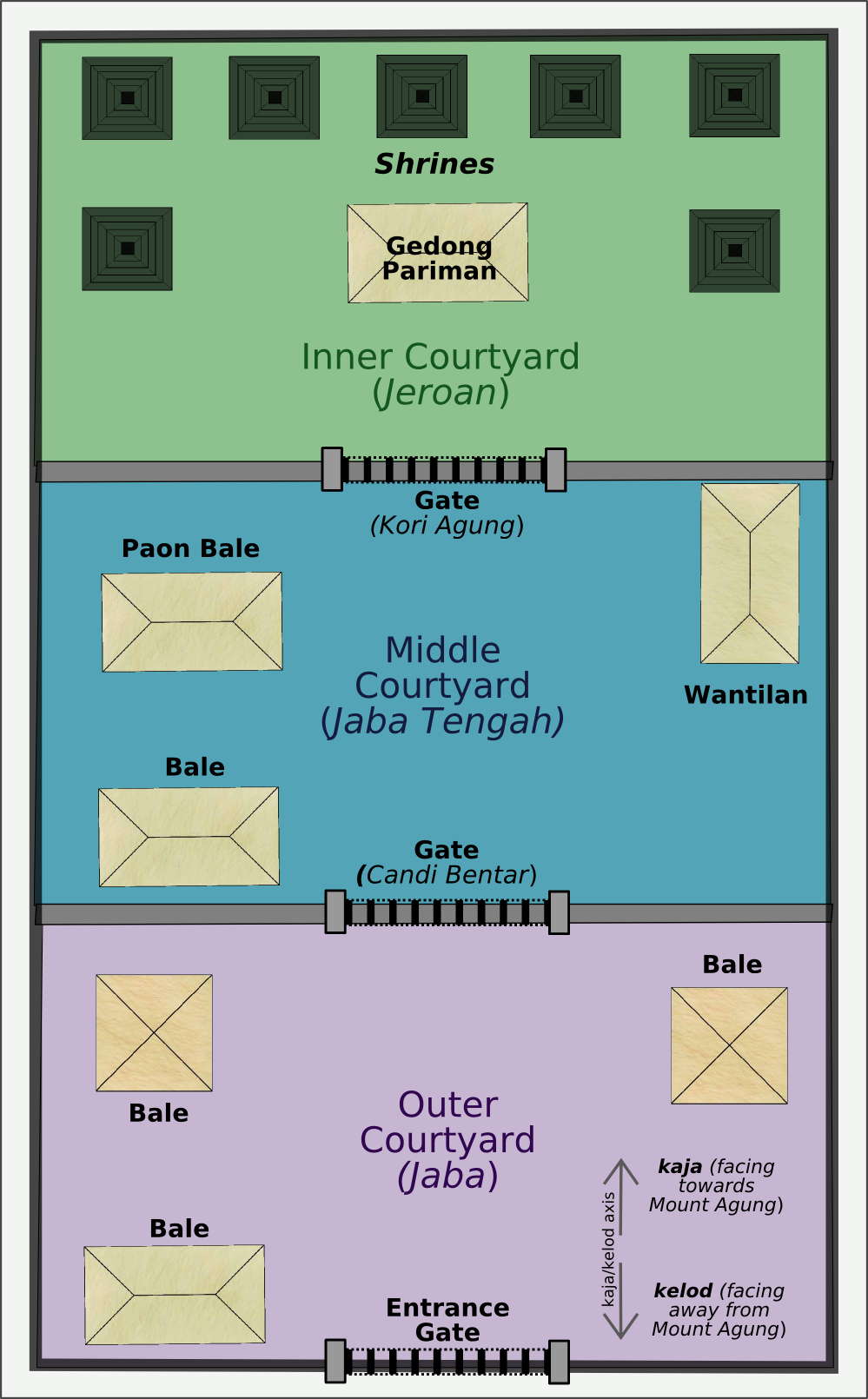
Diagram of a Balinese temple

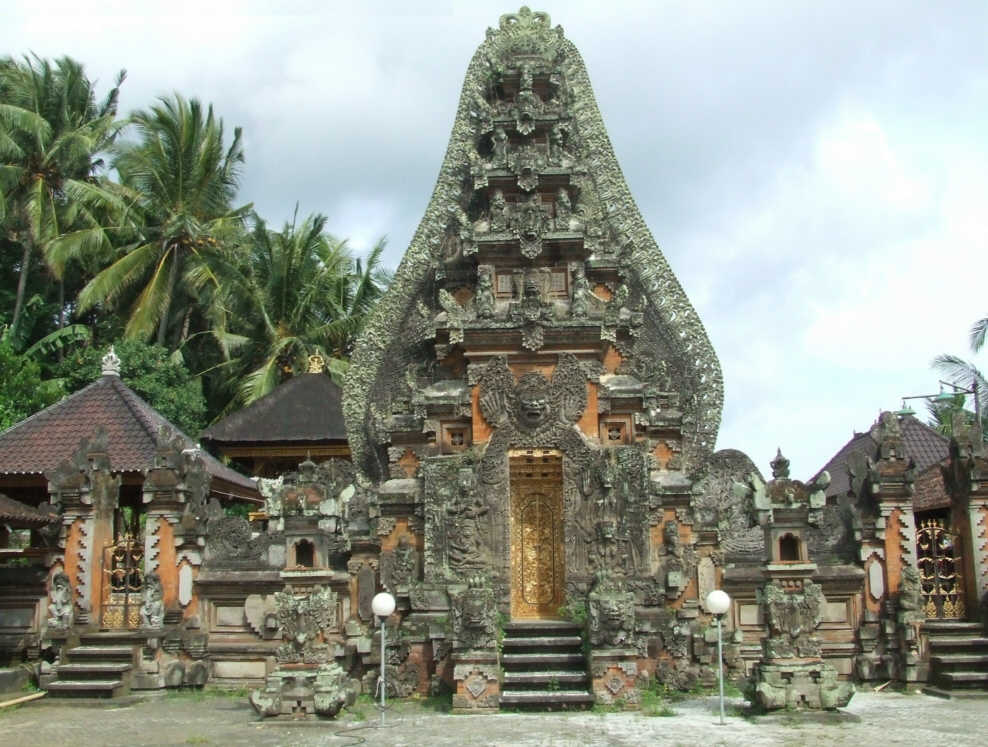
Pura Dalem Sidan (temple)

The Balinese ruling classes seemed fragmented, internally torn by intrigues within dadia, and weakly allied between kingdoms. This poor political integration was aggravated by the political independence of the villages under royal dadia rule. The Balinese state was composed of institutions that cross-cut villages. Villages were not independent, self-contained "village republics" but were cross-cut by membership in three separate locally based political institutions that organized local life: the hamlet (banjar), the irrigation society (subak), and the temple congregation (pemaksan). Villages were also crosscut by tax obligations to different lords.

==== The village (banjar) ====
The Balinese village has been falsely described in the colonial literature as a "village republic", bounded, self-contained and wholly autonomous. According to Geertz, an important part of this book was to disrupt colonial images of the closed corporate village. Geertz emphasizes that the village controlled only certain aspects of the everyday life of Balinese villagers, and that the tax and temple systems cross-cut village membership. That is, the members of a single village might pay taxes through several perbekel and be part of different temple congregations.

The village did have a constitution, which spelled out its members responsibilities for road making, upkeep of public facilities, night watch, and settlement of civil disputes. The village had its own leadership (klian banjar). This range of duties led Geertz to conclude "In brief, perhaps the bulk (though as we shall see, far from the whole) of Balinese government, in the strict sense of authoritative regulation of social life, was carried out by the hamlet, leaving the state free to dramatize power rather than to administer it."

==== The temple congregation (pemaksan) ====
Although focused on religious rites, the pemaksan was a corporate public body that was also an agency of government because of the link between religion and custom, i.e. forms of worship and social behaviour in Bali. Such religious rites were considered "adat" (custom), "the entire framework of social action in which both men and gods are enclosed." The variety of small variations in adat defined the boundaries between pemaksan. The pemaksan thus stands as the moral community, next to the civil community embodied in the hamlet and the economic community in the irrigation society. The pemaksan will draw on one to ten villages for its members.

The pemaksan will maintain the "Three Great Temples" (Kahyangan Tiga): 1) the Origin Temple (Pura Puseh) which commemorates the human settlement of the area. 2) The Death Temple (Pura Dalem) used to pacify the not yet cremated and hence dangerous dead. And 3) the Great Council Temple (Pura Balai Agung) for ensuring the overall fertility of the pemaksan.

==== Irrigation system (Subak) ====
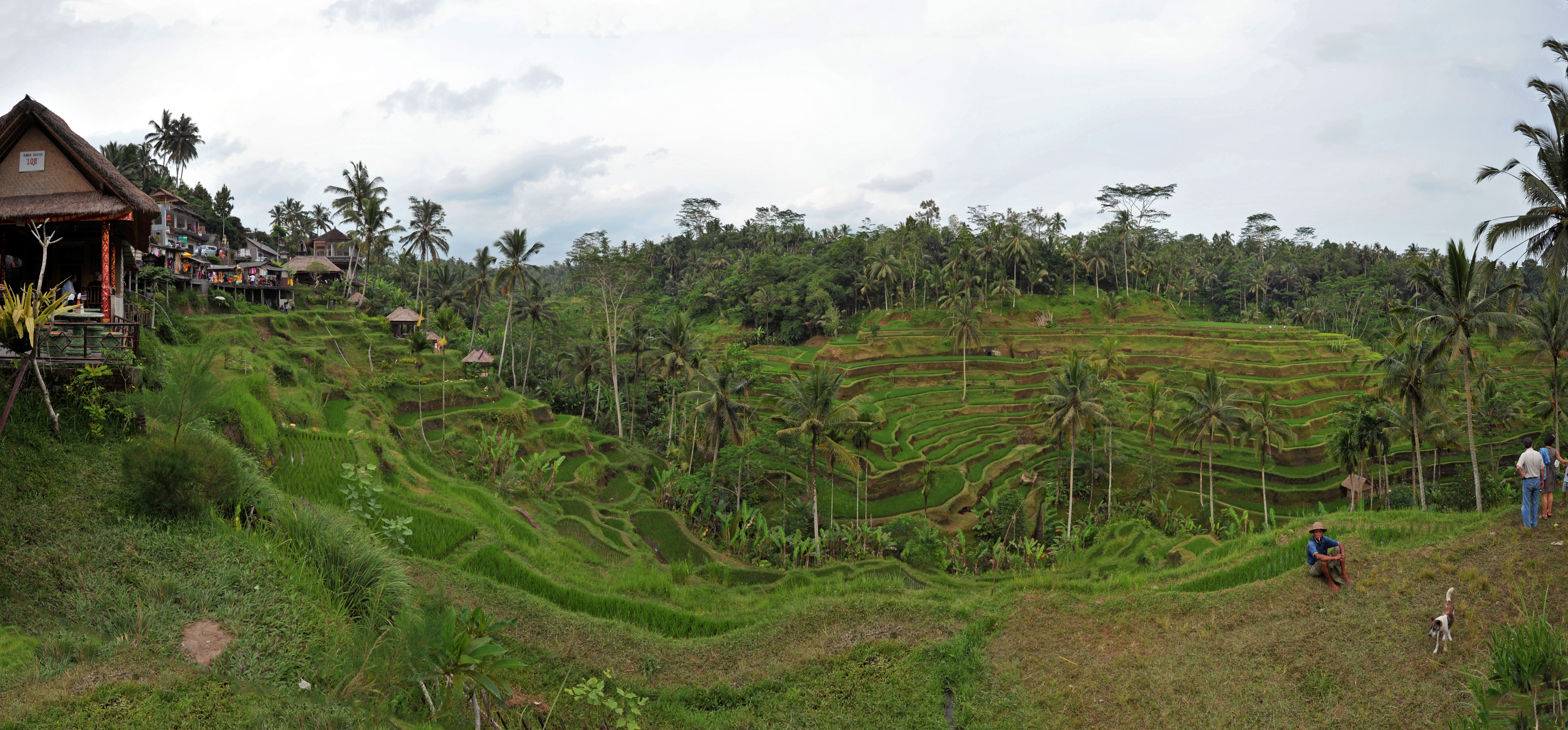
Subak irrigation system

According to Geertz, one of the most important of state institutions in Bali is the irrigation society (subak) given the theoretical emphasis placed upon irrigation in the materialist models of the "Asiatic mode of production." These models viewed the control of irrigation by lords as the major means of also controlling the population that depended on those irrigation works for their sustenance. Geertz views the subak as an autonomous organization separate from the state, much like the banjar. The system of dams, dikes and canals were the property of the subak, and hence controlled by the farmers themselves. Geertz thus dismisses any notion of "primitive communism" - and its spectre, "state capitalism."

A subak controls the water flowing from a single up-river dam. The water flows through its rice terraces to other subaks farther downstream. Once water flowed into a subak it was divided through a series of weirs so that each farmer would get the amount of water they needed at the right time. The regulation of water is thus a serious issue, and encounters regular bottlenecks where control of the supply for a whole subak can be seized. Controlling the complex flow of water within a subak was accomplished through a highly regimented series of rituals. Water temples placed at points of water division would coordinate the flow of water through carefully timed rituals. Geertz emphasizes that there is no central control of the timing of these rituals, and hence that the state is not an "oriental despotism" controlling the population through the control of water.

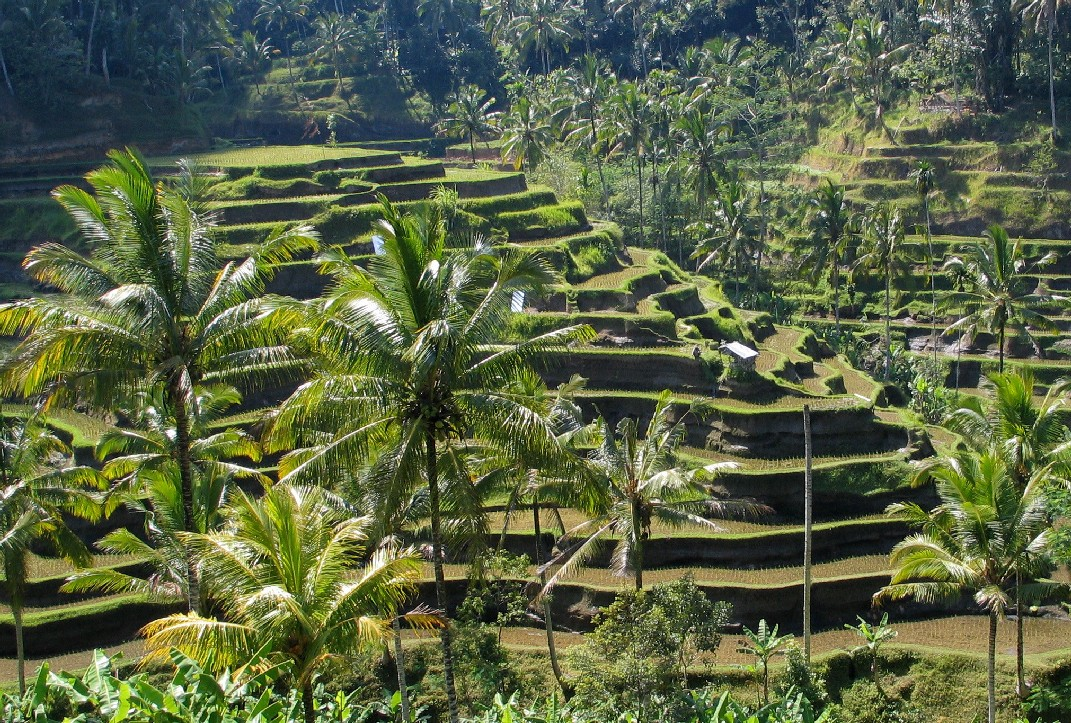
Balinese rice terraces is part of Subak irrigation system.

It is Geertz's characterization of the irrigation system as headless that has attracted critique. Stephen Lansing's examination of Balinese irrigation shows that the need for effective water management links thousands of farmers in clear hierarchies, beginning with the most sacred temples dedicated to the Goddess of the volcanic Crater Lake (Mount Agung) that all Balinese hold sacred, and descending into the plains and low-lying rice fields. Drawing on nineteenth century Balinese records, Brigitta Hauser-Schaublin has shown that regional lords and kings played a large role in managing irrigation, and that this role was lost only in the Dutch colonial period. She argues that Geertz's failure to see the larger state role in water management reflects this change in colonial practice, thereby weakening the "theatre state" model.

==== The Perbekel system ====
The free, land-owning kawulas made up 90% of the population. Kawulas were attached to a perbekel, a "political foreman" to whom they owed specific obligations and taxes. The perbekels were attached to punggawas, the lords of dadia. Unlike the village, none of these political roles was based upon territorial residence. In other words, membership in the village was cross-cut by obligations to different perbekels and their lords. Bali was thus not a feudal realm where lords controlled land and people within a fiefdom. Lords and kawulas owned their own land, and lords did not generally seek their kawulas as tenants on their land. Kawulas had only two obligations to their perbekels: ritual service and military support: "He was a stagehand, spear carrier, and claqueur in an endless political opera."

==== Trade ====
Although Bali lies along major Indonesian trade roots in the north, its mountainous geography orients it to the south; its only navigable port was at Kuta, on a southern peninsula. The bulk of trade remained in foreign hands, including the Chinese, Javanese, Buginese and Europeans. Foreigners were largely restricted to these insulated ports of trade. Trade within Bali occurred in rotating markets characterized by traditional fixed exchange rates. Goods and services were also circulated through large scale redistributive ceremonies.

The organization of international trade was leased out by the king to a subandar (harbour master), who served as an intermediary between the traders and the dadia of the royal house, to whom he paid the rent. This rent was paid to each Lord of the royal house whenever they held a ceremony. The more ceremonies held, the greater share a Lord would receive of the spoils of trade. The point of trade then, was to hold larger spectacles.

=== Spectacle and political power ===
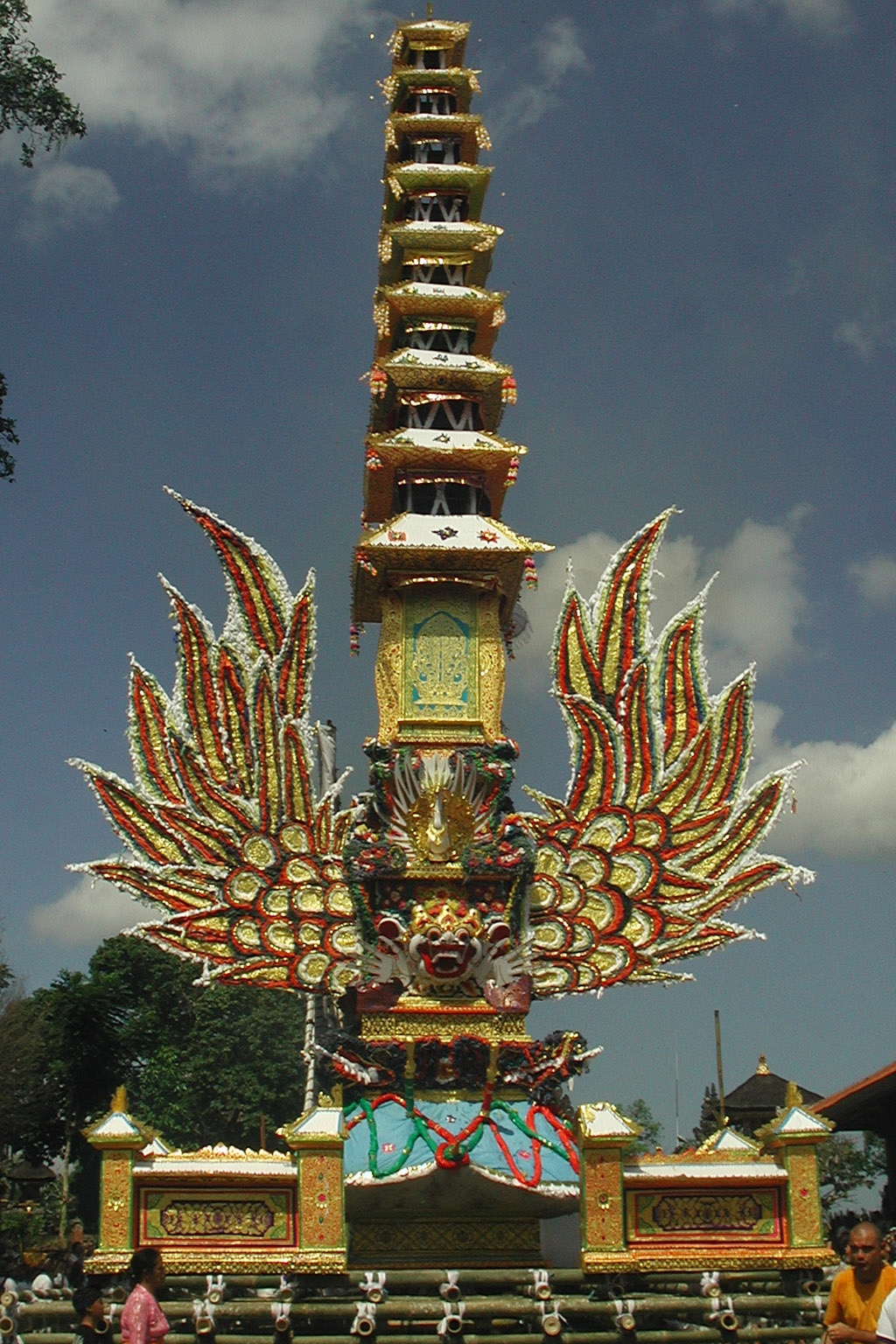
Balinese Cremation tower

Geertz argues that state ceremonials in the Negara were "metaphysical theatre"; that is, theatre designed to express a vision of the ultimate nature of reality that at the same time tried to shape current conditions to match that reality. Ritual events all re-created social relations of jero ("inner", to whom one surrendered power in the ritual event thereby making them powerful) and jaba ("outer", a provider of services to those who are jero) between lords and their kawula. Every ritual performance reproduced jero-jaba relations as both symbolic ideal and pragmatic reality, thereby reinforcing social order. Thus, although the state was cross-cut by the conflicting jurisdictions of temples, hamlets, and irrigation societies, they all come together for mass state rituals in which the ideal social order of the state is made real.

==== The role of the cremation ceremony ====
The cremation ceremony was the largest and most ostentatious of the state rituals, attended by all the political dependants of a lord. At the centre of the ritual was the cremation tower (badé) on which the body of the deceased lord rested in state until the whole was consumed in fire. The cremation tower itself symbolized the cosmic order the ritual sought to make real. At its base were the world of demons (winged serpents), above which stood a platform called the House, representing the world of man. Above that were the tiers of roofs symbolizing the world of the gods, to which the deceased was ascending; a commoner would ascend to the first heaven (1 tier), whereas a king to the eleventh.

While having an eleven-storey tower was iconic of regal status, accomplishing a cremation ritual was an accomplishment - a struggle - that justified that status. The first part of the ceremony, for example, involved transporting the tower in a procession to the cremation ground, a mob scene involving thousands; some of these carried the bier forward, while others tried to stop it. The struggle could potentially prevent those who lacked the status and resources from making what others felt were false claims; the scene "was a bit like a playful riot - a deliberated, even studied, violence, designed to set off a no less deliberated and even more studied stillness, which the variously imperturbable priests, agnates, widows and tributary dead contrived to gather about the central tower."

== Reception and critique of the book ==
Notable mandala states in Southeast Asian history (circa 5th to 15th century). From north to south; Bagan, Ayutthaya, Champa, Angkor, Srivijaya and Majapahit.

Although Geertz considered this the pinnacle of his thinking on politics and history, reactions to the book have been mixed, "combining admiration for its scope and ambition with scepticism about its claims."

One source of the scepticism is that the book is clearly not a history of a specific polity, but a generalized ideal-type model intended to guide representations of the Southeast Asian Indic states found in Bali, Java, Malaysia, Thailand and Burma in the fifth to fifteenth centuries. As such, it is one of several models, such as that of O.W. Wolters "mandala" model, or Stanley Tambiah's model of the "Galactic polity."

Geertz made it clear that his emphasis was a general model of the "theatre state" and not a specific Balinese kingdom by referring to the Balinese state with the Indic term Negara, whereas the Balinese refer to their pre-colonial state as a kerajaan. As such, it over-estimates the Indic influence on Bali, and under-estimates its similarities with Polynesian kingdoms in Tahiti, Samoa and Hawaii.

Critiques of the book have focused on the following points:

1. As a culturalist approach to history, it is remarkably static and ahistorical. Fredrik Barth argued that it "depoliticized" a political institution as a result.
2. By subordinating power to culture, the book ignores the material base of power. Since Geertz's book was published, several other historical studies of particular kingdoms have appeared which emphasize the more conventional political economic forms of power underlying the state.
3. Geertz makes the ritual aspect of Balinese culture "more exotic, more extraordinary and more other than the evidence warrants."
4. Tambiah notes that Geertz presents the Balinese kings as, at once, the focus of ritual theatre that creates the exemplary centre as a still point, "immobilized into passivity and reflective trances" yet at the same time "Rent by virtually continuous intrigue, dispute, violence and an enormous amount of micro-upheaval." Despite his best effort, Geertz does not transcend the break between expressive and instrumental action, or between power as pomp and power as control of people and resources. He thus leaves himself open to Marxist critiques that view the state as a mystification, an "illusory representation of the unity of the village communities (as Marx put it in his sketch of 'oriental despotism'), and that the ceremonies of state are nothing but the spiritualizing of material interests and the covering up of material conflicts."

== See also ==
- Mandala (Southeast Asian political model)
- Rajamandala
- Palace economy
