= Atariya =

- Village
- Location within Uttar Pradesh Location within India
- Coordinates: 27.542911°N 79.741007°E
- Country: India
- State: Uttar Pradesh
- District: Hardoi
- Talukas: Sawayajpur

Area
  - Total: 2.5 km^{2} (0.97 sq mi)
  - Rank: 5
- Elevation: 148 m (486 ft)

Population (2011)
  - Total: 437
  - Rank: 2
  - Density: 170/km^{2} (450/sq mi)

Language
  - Official: Hindi
  - Additional official: Urdu
- Time zone: UTC+5:30 (IST)
- Area code: 241123
- Vehicle registration: UP 30

Atariya is a village in the Hardoi district of the Indian state of Uttar Pradesh. Atariya village is situated 48 km away from district headquarter Hardoi.

== Geography ==
Atariya is situated to the north of Mahmudpur village.

== Demographics ==
As of 2011 Indian Census, Atariya had a total population of 437, of which 248 were males and 189 were females. Population within the age group of 0 to 6 years was 62. The total number of literates in Atariya was 201, which constituted 46% of the population with male literacy of 54.8% and female literacy of 35.4%. The effective literacy rate of 7+ population of Bahraich was 53.6%, of which male literacy rate was 61.5% and female literacy rate was 42.2%. The sex ratio is 762 females for 1000 males. Atariya had 63 households in 2011.
