= Nagari (surname) =

Nagari is a surname. Notable people with the surname include:

- Moses Nagari (fl. 14th century), Jewish philosopher
- Muhammad Yahya Rasool Nagari (died 2020), Pakistani Quran reciter
- Shahabuddin Nagari (born 1955), Bangladeshi poet
