= Vijayanagar, Belgaum =

Vijayanagar
- Village
- Country: India
- State: Karnataka
- District: Belgaum
- Talukas: Chikodi

Population (2011)
  - Total: 1,465 (275 households)

Languages
  - Official: Kannada
- Time zone: UTC+5:30 (IST)

Vijayanagar is a small village located in the Belgaum district, Karnataka state in southern India. It is located a few kilometres south of Kabbur.
