= Nagari =

Nagari may refer to:

== Writing systems ==
- Nāgarī script, a script used in India during the first millennium
- Devanagari, a script used since the late first millennium and currently in widespread use for the languages of northern India
- Nandinagari, a script used in southern India from the late first millennium until the 19th century
- Sylheti Nagari, a script used in the Sylhet area of Bangladesh and nearby parts of India

== Places ==
- Nagari, Andhra Pradesh, a town in India
  - Nagari Assembly constituency
- Nagari, Rajasthan, a village in India

== Other uses ==
- Nagari (surname)
- Nagari (settlement), an administrative unit in parts of Sumatra, Indonesia
- Bolwell Nagari, a sports car produced in Australia by Bolwell
- Nagari, a clan of the Gujjar / Gurjar ethnic group

== See also ==
- Nagar (disambiguation)
- Nagri (disambiguation)
- Ngari (disambiguation)
- Nigari, a Japanese term for the magnesium chloride used in tofu-making
