= Nahar, East Azerbaijan =

Nahar نهار
- Village
- Location within Iran
- Coordinates: 38°33′03″N 46°51′24″E
- Country: Iran
- Province: East Azerbaijan
- County: Ahar
- Bakhsh: Central
- Rural District: Azghan

Population (2006)
  - Total: 289
- Time zone: UTC+3:30 (IRST)
  - Summer (DST): UTC+4:30 (IRDT)

Nahar (Persian: نهار, also Romanized as Nahār; also known as Nagar’) is a village in Azghan Rural District, in the Central District of Ahar County, East Azerbaijan Province, Iran. At the 2006 census, its population was 289, in 57 families.
