= Nagri =

Nagri may refer to:

- Nagri, Chhattishgarh, a town in Chhattishgarh, India
- Nagri, Jharkhand, a village in Jharkhand, India
- Nagri block, an administrative unit of Ranchi district in Jharkhand, India
- a variant of the name "Nagari", which may refer to several writing systems:
  - Nāgarī script, a script used in India during the first millennium
  - Devanagari, a script used since the late first millennium and currently in widespread use for the languages of northern India
  - Nandinagari, a script used in southern India from the late first millennium until the 19th century
  - Sylheti Nagari, a script used in the Sylhet area of Bangladesh and nearby parts of India

== See also ==
- Nagari (disambiguation)
- Nagri (disambiguation)
