= Indirapuram =

- Residential Location
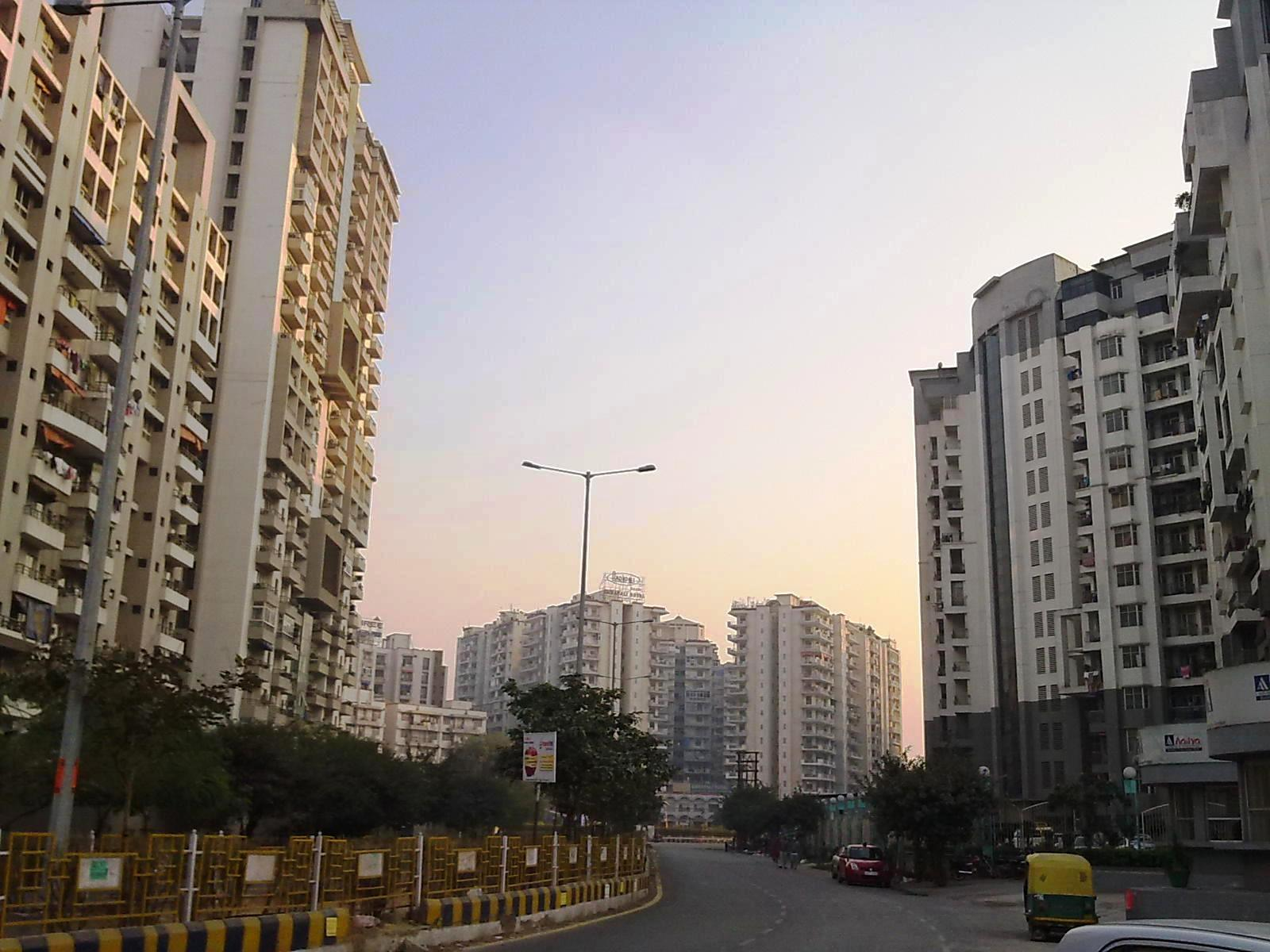
- Indirapuram skyline
- Interactive map of Indirapuram
- Country: India
- State: Uttar Pradesh
- District: Ghaziabad

Indirapuram is an established residential locality in the city of Ghaziabad, in Uttar Pradesh, India. Indirapuram was founded on 28 February 1996, as a sub-city to Delhi.

The locality is just 5 km away from two Blue Line metro stations of Vaishali and Noida Electronic City.
