= Rajarampur =

Village in Uttar Pradesh, India

- Village
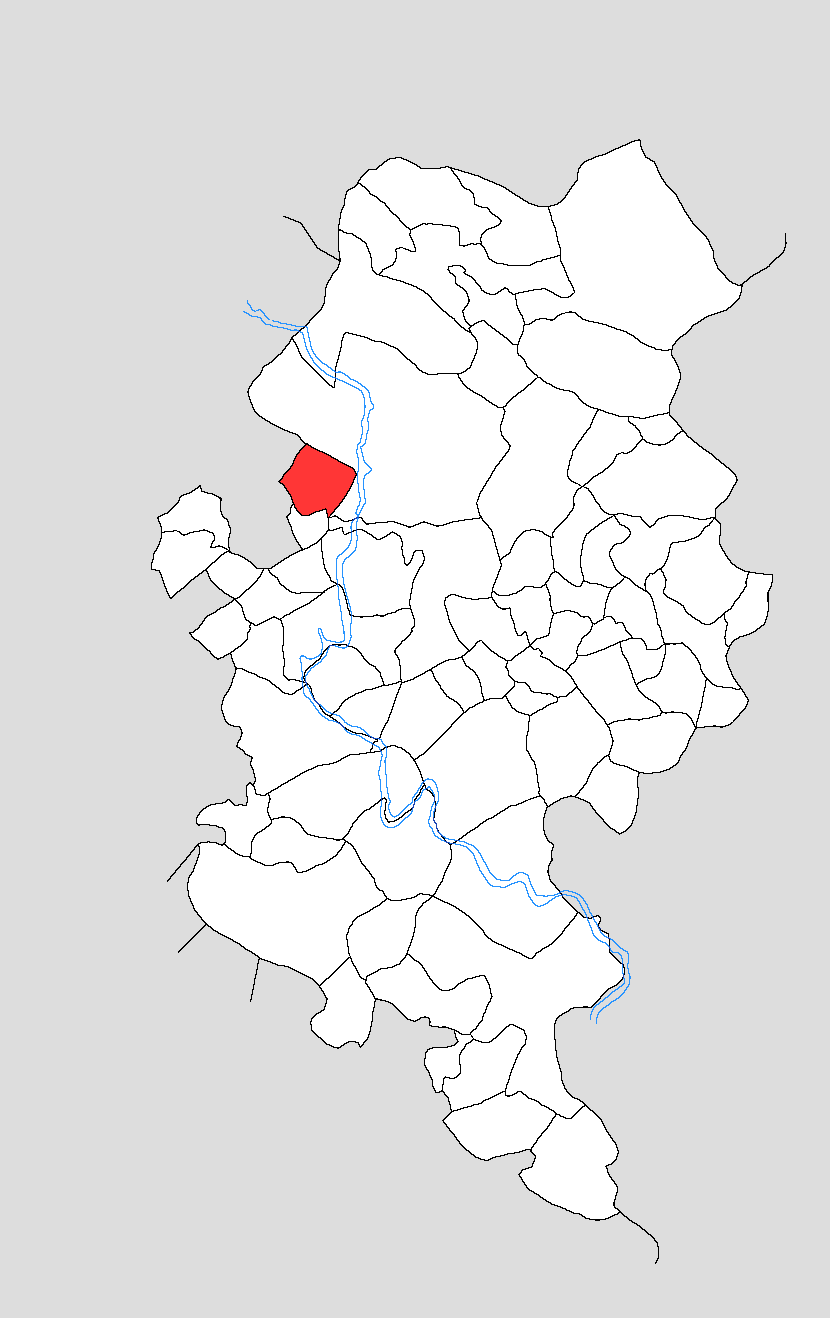
- Map showing Rajarampur in Kotla block

- Location in Uttar Pradesh, India
- Coordinates: 27.30464°N 78.38033°E
- Country: India
- State: Uttar Pradesh
- District: Firozabad
- Tehsil: Firozabad

Area
  - Total: 2.132 km^{2} (0.823 sq mi)

Population (2011)
  - Total: 872
  - Density: 409/km^{2} (1,060/sq mi)
- Time zone: UTC+5:30 (IST)
- PIN: 283203

Rajarampur (Rājārāmpur) is a village in Kotla block of Firozabad district, Uttar Pradesh, India. As of 2011, it had a population of 872, in 156 households.

== Demographics ==
As of 2011, Rajarampur had a population of 872, in 156 households. This population was 54.2% male (473) and 45.8% female (399). The 0-6 age group numbered 126 (58 male and 68 female), making up 14.4% of the total population. 194 residents were members of Scheduled Castes, or 22.2% of the total.

The 1981 census recorded Rajarampur as having a population of 612 people (338 male and 274 female), in 91 households and 88 physical houses.

== Infrastructure ==
As of 2011, Rajarampur had 1 primary school; it did not have any healthcare facilities. Drinking water was provided by hand pump and tube well/borehole; there were no public toilets. The village did not have a post office or public library; there was at least some access to electricity for residential and agricultural (but not commercial) purposes. Streets were made of both kachcha and pakka materials.
