= Nagar, Punjab =

Nagar
- Village
- Location in Punjab, India Nagar (India)
- Coordinates: 31.0414532°N 75.8331514°E
- Country: India
- State: Punjab
- District: Jalandhar
- Tehsil: Phillaur

Government
  - Type: Panchayat raj
  - Body: Gram panchayat
- Elevation: 246 m (807 ft)

Population (2011)
  - Total: 3,187

Languages
  - Official: Punjabi
  - Other spoken: Hindi
- Time zone: UTC+5:30 (IST)
- PIN: 144410
- Telephone code: 01826
- ISO 3166 code: IN-PB
- Vehicle registration: PB 37
- Sex ratio: 964 ♂/♀
- Post office: Phillaur
- Website: jalandhar.nic.in

Nagar is a village in the Phillaur tehsil of Jalandhar District of the Indian state of Punjab. It is located on Phillaur-Nawanshahr Road, 6.7 kilometres (4.2 mi) from the head postal office in Phillaur, 7 kilometres (4.3 mi) from Apra, 50 kilometres (31 mi) from Jalandhar, and 117 kilometres (73 mi) from the state capital of Chandigarh. The village is administered by the Sarpanch, an elected representative.

== Demographics ==
According to the 2011 Census, Nagar has a population of 3187. 1622 are males, while 1565 are females. Nagar has a literacy rate of 81.80%, higher than the average literacy rate of Punjab.

Most villagers belong to a Schedule Caste (SC), comprising 56.07% of the total.

== Landmarks ==
The area has several religious sites famous. These include: Gurudwara Shri Guru Nanak Singh Sabha, Gurudwara Sahid Baba Dalel Singh Ji, Gurdwara Dera Sahib Baba Bhadbhag Singh Ji, Dera St Baba Mela Ram Ji, Shiv mandir temple.

== Facilities ==
The village has two banks: the HDFC Bank and Canara Bank.

== Education ==
The village has a co-ed primary school (Pri Nagar School) and a girls-only primary and secondary school (Ghs Nagar (G) School). Schools in Nagar provide a mid-day meal as per the Indian Midday Meal Scheme.

== Transport ==
Phillaur Junction is the nearest train station. Bhatian Railway Station is 13 kilometres (8.1 mi) away from the village.

The nearest airport is located 37.4 kilometres (23.2 mi) away from Ludhiana. The nearest international airport is located in Chandigarh.
