= Bhattian =

- Village
- Location in Punjab, India Bhattian (India)
- Coordinates: 31.0701063°N 75.7790297°E
- Country: India
- State: Punjab
- District: Jalandhar
- Tehsil: Phillaur

Government
  - Type: Panchayat raj
  - Body: Gram panchayat
- Elevation: 246 m (807 ft)

Population (2011)
  - Total: 687
- Sex ratio 354/333 ♂/♀

Languages
  - Official: Punjabi
- Time zone: UTC+5:30 (IST)
- PIN: 144410
- Telephone code: 01826
- ISO 3166 code: IN-PB
- Vehicle registration: PB 37
- Post office: Phillaur
- Website: jalandhar.nic.in

Bhattian is a village in the Phillaur tehsil of Jalandhar District of the Indian state of Punjab. It is located on 8 kilometres (5.0 mi) from the head postal office in Phillaur, 7.5 kilometres (4.7 mi) from Goraya, 50 kilometres (31 mi) from Jalandhar, and 117 kilometres (73 mi) from the state capital of Chandigarh. The village is administered by the Sarpanch, an elected representative.

== Demographics ==
According to the 2011 Census, Bhatian has a population of 687. The village has a literacy rate of 78.77%, higher than the average literacy rate of Punjab.

79.04% of the population belongs to a Schedule Caste (SC).

== Education ==
The village has a co-ed primary school (Pri Bhattian School) which provide a mid-day meal as per the Indian Midday Meal Scheme.

== Transport ==
Bhattian has a railway station which is 7.5 kilometres (4.7 mi) from Phillaur Junction and 9 kilometres (5.6 mi) away from the Goraya railway station.

The nearest airport is located 36.6 kilometres (22.7 mi) away in Ludhiana. The nearest international airport is in Chandigarh.
