= Rurka Kalan =

Rurka Kalan, Punjab
- Village
- Nickname: Bara Rurka
- Location within Punjab Location within India
- Coordinates: 31.07°N 75.41°E
- Country: India
- State: Punjab
- Gram Panchyat: Rurka Kalan

Government
  - Type: Local Government
  - Body: Government of India
  - MLA: Vikramjit Singh Choudhary (2022)

Area
  - Total: 14 km^{2} (5.4 sq mi)
- Elevation: 567 m (1,860 ft)

Population (2011)
  - Total: 7,467
  - Rank: 2000th
  - Density: 530/km^{2} (1,400/sq mi)

Languages
  - Principal: Hindi, Punjabi
- Time zone: UTC+5:30 (IST)
- PIN: 144031
- Telephone code: 91-182-6XX XXXX
- ISO 3166 code: IN-PB
- Vehicle registration: PB- 37

Rurka Kalan is a village in the Tehsil Phillaur, Jalandhar, Punjab, India. Khurd and Kalan are Persian language words which mean small and Big respectively when two villages have same name then it is distinguished as Kalan means Big and Khurd means Small with Village Name.

== Demographics ==
According to the 2001 Census, Rurka Kalan has a population of 7,467 people. Rurka Kalan was incorporated as a village but due to population growth the size of the village is approaching that of a small town. Rurka Kalan has a significant number of families with the "Sandhu" surname.

== History ==
=== Pre colonial era ===
As per district gazetteer The villagers stated in 1904 that village was founded by migrated Sandhu Jats of majha as they mentioned they came here around 150 years ago from south Majha the exact date could be around 1750s.

=== Colonial era ===
Bachint Singh, also known as the King of Rurka Kalan, declared the village an independent state in 1929, in defiance of the British Raj. He formed a panchayat with the help of the village electorate and became sarpanch of the village. The regular armed forces and police were prohibited from entering the village until Bachint Singh was arrested.

== Location ==
Rurka Kalan lies on the Jandiala-Goraya road, 5 km (3.1 mi) west of Goraya. It lies in northern Punjab above the reaches of the Sutlej River. It has good road links to the surrounding Tehsils and nearby cities of Ludhiana, Phagwara and Jalandhar. Rurka Kalan is surrounded by villages; Pasla to the west, Rajgomal to the north, Dhesian Sang to the East and Dhinsay to the South. The village lies in a rural location on the plains that dominate the geography of Punjab.

The village is split into five Pattis (wards): Patti Bulla Ki, Bhunder Ki, Gau Ki, Heta Ki and Rawal Ki.

== Transport ==
=== Road ===
The major north–south Grand Trunk Road is only 8 km (5.0 mi) away, at its interchange in Goraya. Many buses are available from Goaraya city to Rurka Kalan.

=== Rail ===
The nearest station to Rurka Kalan is Goraya Railway Station, situated on the main line between Delhi and Amritsar. Numerous local stopping trains (MEMU & DMU) operate travelling to Jalandhar and Ludhiana. There are a number of regional expresses that also stop at the station occasionally. For further connections to longer distance services including to the union capital, Delhi, one can travel either to Phagwara or Ludhiana and change for longer distance services.

=== Bus and taxi ===
Regular private bus services operate between Rurka and the various surrounding villages and towns, as well as the Tempo three-wheeler service. These operate from both the Jandiala Road Bus Stop and Goraya Road Bus Stop. Services connect with some Interstate and State Bus Transport at Goraya. Other Interstate and State buses can be caught from Phagwara bus stand.

For a personal service, a minivan taxi service can be hired from the Goraya Road bus stop.

=== Air ===
The nearest airport is Sahnewal Airport, located in Ludhiana. The airport runs a limited service; other regional airports provide a regular service and a wider choice of destinations. Sri Guru Ram Dass Jee International Airport in Amritsar offers regional air travel as well as destinations in the Middle East, North America and Europe. Regular regional air services can also be caught from Chandigarh Airport, which is currently in the progress of upgrading to International Airport capability. Flydubai were keen to start operating an international air service between Dubai and Chandigarh but the proposal fell through due to the lack of facilities. The governments of the Union territory, Punjab and Haryana are now pressing ahead with upgrades that will enable handling of international flights.

== Sports and recreation ==
=== YFC Rurka Kalan ===
In the effort to provide the youth of the village with something meaningful to do and to provide a means to compete in football under the village's banner, the Youth Football Club was formed in 2001. It has risen from a local concern to a respected football team that plays at many different competing levels of youth football. Facilities include a well maintained football pitch, gym facilities, computing classroom and boarding facilities for 24 players.

== Education ==
There are a number of schools and institutions located in the village; two Government-run senior secondary schools, mixed gender and girls only; the Arya Senior Secondary School; two mixed gender Primary Schools.

== Notable people ==
- Anwar Ali, footballer, defender for Mumbai F.C.
- Amarjit Singh Samra, MLA for Nakodar
- Garry Sandhu, Punjabi singer and actor
- Gurinder Sandhu
- Harpreet Sandhu, actor
