= Goraya =

- City
- Location in Punjab, India Goraya (India)
- Coordinates: 31.13°N 75.77°E
- Country: India
- State: Punjab
- District: Jalandhar
- Tehsil: Goraya

Government
  - Body: Municipal Council

Population (2011)
  - Total: 16,462; 8,657/7,805♂/♀
  - Total Households: 3,590

Languages
  - Official: Punjabi
- Time zone: UTC+5:30 (IST)
- PIN: 144409
- Telephone code: 01826
- Vehicle registration: PB 37

Goraya is a city in Jalandhar district and Tehsil of the Indian state of Punjab. It lies between Jalandhar and stretch of National Highway 44 (Old NH 1), Grand Trunk Road. Goraya city was famous for manufacturing of foundry objects, bearings and other steel products before the 1990s. The city was known as The Manchester of Punjab. Even today's grass cutting machines (toka) and ball bearings are manufactured. The famous gear making company Guru Nanak Auto GNA has offices in Goraya. Government and private schools are there but a college is not available in the city.

== Demography ==
As of 2011, the town has a total number of 3590 houses and the population of 16,462 of which include 8,657 are males while 7,805 are females. According to the report published by Census India in 2011, out of the total population of the village 4,864 people are from Schedule Caste and the village does not have any Schedule Tribe population so far.

== Geography ==
Goraya is located at 31.13°N 75.77°E. It has an average elevation of 240 metres (790 ft). The town has a humid subtropical climate with cool winters and hot summers. Summers last from April to June and winters from November to February. Temperatures in summer vary from average highs of around 44 °C (111 °F) to average lows of around 25 °C (77 °F). Winter temperatures vary from highs of 19 °C (66 °F) to lows of −5 °C (23 °F). On the whole, the climate is dry except during the brief southwest monsoon season during July–August. The average annual rainfall is about 70 centimetres (28 in).

== Education and religion ==
There are various government and public schools and colleges in Goraya J.S.F.H khalsa Senior Sec School, S.H.I.P.S, SR. Sec govt schools, Brilliant Convent school and some other private schools have been doing well as a medium of providing education to children of the area. There are places for worshipping like mandirs, dargah and gurudwaras.
