= Bhatt Majra =

Bhatt Majra is the name of multiple places:

- Bhatt Majra, Fatehgarh Sahib
- Bhatt Majra, Patiala
