= List of State Protected Monuments in Punjab, India =

This is a list of State Protected Monuments as officially reported by and available through the website of the Archaeological Survey of India in the Indian state Punjab. The monument identifier is a combination of the abbreviation of the subdivision of the list (state, ASI circle) and the numbering as published on the website of the ASI. 61 State Protected Monuments have been recognized by the ASI in Punjab. Besides the State Protected Monuments, also the Monuments of National Importance in this state might be relevant.

== List of state protected monuments ==
SL. No.	Description	Location	Address	District	Coordinates	Image
S-PB-1	Sarai Khwaspur	Amritsar				Upload Photo
S-PB-2	Kos Minar, Bharowal	Amritsar				Upload Photo
S-PB-3	Gate of Sarai and Mosque, Fatehabad	Amritsar				Upload Photo
S-PB-4	Old Tehsil, Ajnala	Ajnala		Amritsar		Old Tehsil, Ajnala
S-PB-5	Kos Minar-Norangabad	Amritsar				Upload Photo
S-PB-6	Anglo Sikh War Memorial, Sabhraon	Ferozepur				Upload Photo
S-PB-7	Anglo Sikh War Memorial, Ferozeshan	Ferozepur				Upload Photo
S-PB-8	Anglo Sikh War Memorial, Misriwala	Ferozepur				Upload Photo
S-PB-9	Anglo Sikh War Memorial Mudki	Ferozepur				Upload Photo
S-PB-10	Aam Khas Bagh, Sirhind	Fatehgarh Sahib				Aam Khas Bagh, Sirhind
S-PB-10-a	Aam Khas Bagh, Sirhind: Palace	Fatehgarh Sahib				Upload Photo
S-PB-10-b	Aam Khas Bagh, Sirhind: Chabutra	Fatehgarh Sahib				Upload Photo
S-PB-10-c	Aam Khas Bagh, Sirhind: Sheesh Mahal	Fatehgarh Sahib				Upload Photo
S-PB-10-d	Aam Khas Bagh, Sirhind: Naughara (Aramgah-E-Muqaddas)	Fatehgarh Sahib				Upload Photo
S-PB-10-e	Aam Khas Bagh, Sirhind: Hamam	Fatehgarh Sahib				Aam Khas Bagh, Sirhind: Hamam
S-PB-10-f	Aam Khas Bagh, Sirhind: Sardkhana	Fatehgarh Sahib				Aam Khas Bagh, Sirhind: Sardkhana
S-PB-10-g	Aam Khas Bagh, Sirhind: Daulat Khana-Ekhas	Fatehgarh Sahib				Aam Khas Bagh, Sirhind: Daulat Khana-Ekhas
S-PB-10-h	Aam Khas Bagh, Sirhind: Hathikhana	Fatehgarh Sahib				Upload Photo
S-PB-10-i	Aam Khas Bagh, Sirhind: Sarai Wing (Eastern)	Fatehgarh Sahib				Aam Khas Bagh, Sirhind: Sarai Wing (Eastern)
S-PB-10-j	Aam Khas Bagh, Sirhind: Sarai Wing (Western)	Fatehgarh Sahib				Upload Photo
S-PB-10-k	Aam Khas Bagh, Sirhind: Main Tank in front of Sheesh Mahal	Fatehgarh Sahib				Aam Khas Bagh, Sirhind: Main Tank in front of Sheesh Mahal
S-PB-10-l	Aam Khas Bagh, Sirhind: Fountain channels with fountain, flower Beds, falls etc. in front of Hamam, Naugharana and Sardkhana	Fatehgarh Sahib				Aam Khas Bagh, Sirhind: Fountain channels with fountain, flower Beds, falls etc. in front of Hamam, Naugharana and Sardkhana
S-PB-10-m	Aam Khas Bagh, Sirhind: Wells-3 Nos.	Fatehgarh Sahib				Aam Khas Bagh, Sirhind: Wells-3 Nos.
S-PB-11	Tomb of Ustad, vill Talania, Sirhind	Fatehgarh Sahib				Tomb of Ustad, vill Talania, Sirhind
S-PB-12	Tomb of Shagird, vill Talania	Fatehgarh Sahib				Tomb of Shagird, vill Talania
S-PB-13	Tomb of Amir Ali, vill. Dera Meer Mian	Fatehgarh Sahib				Upload Photo
S-PB-14	Mosque Bhagat Sadna Kasai, Sirhind	Fatehgarh Sahib				Mosque Bhagat Sadna Kasai, Sirhind
S-PB-15	Jahaji Haveli, Todar Mal, Sirhind	Fatehgarh Sahib				Jahaji Haveli, Todar Mal, Sirhind
S-PB-16	Old Thana Jaito Monument	Faridkot				Upload Photo
S-PB-17	Jhandewala Temple, Dholbaha	Hoshiarpur				Upload Photo
S-PB-18	Excavated Temple, Dholbaha	Hoshiarpur				Upload Photo
S-PB-19	Mansa Devi Temple, Dholbaha	Hoshiarpur				Upload Photo
S-PB-20	Ancient Temple, Dholbaha	Hoshiarpur				Upload Photo
S-PB-21	Octagonal Well, Dholbaha	Hoshiarpur				Upload Photo
S-PB-22	Samadh Takhowal (Mukerian)	Hoshiarpur				Upload Photo
S-PB-23	Mandir Hari Devi, Bhawanipur	Hoshiarpur				Upload Photo
S-PB-24	Kos Minar, vill. Toot	Jalandhar				Upload Photo
S-PB-25	Commissioner's Residence	Jalandhar				Upload Photo
S-PB-26	Moorish Mosque	Kapurthala				Moorish Mosque
S-PB-27	Handira-Sultanpur Lodhi	Kapurthala				Handira-Sultanpur Lodhi
S-PB-28	Gol Kothi (Kapurthala)	Kapurthala				Gol Kothi (Kapurthala)
S-PB-29	Mughal Sarai, Doraha (Carvon)	Ludhiana				Mughal Sarai, Doraha (Carvon)
S-PB-30	Anglo Sikh War Memorial Aliwal (with approach path way)	Ludhiana				Upload Photo
S-PB-31	Ancestral House of Lala Lajpat Rai Jagraon& Plot in front of house	Ludhiana				Upload Photo
S-PB-32	Kos Minar, Kot Paniach	Ludhiana				Upload Photo
S-PB-33	Ancestral House of Shaheed Kartar Sigh	Ludhiana				Upload Photo
S-PB-34	Ancestral House of Shaheed Bhagat Singh, Khatkarkalan	Nawanshahar				Upload Photo
S-PB-35	Sheesh Mahal, Patiala	Patiala				Sheesh Mahal, Patiala
S-PB-35-a	Sheesh Mahal, Patiala: Towers 4 No.s	Patiala				Upload Photo
S-PB-35-b	Sheesh Mahal, Patiala: Banasar Tank	Patiala				Sheesh Mahal, Patiala: Banasar Tank
S-PB-35-c	Sheesh Mahal, Patiala: Banasar House	Patiala				Sheesh Mahal, Patiala: Banasar House
S-PB-35-d	Sheesh Mahal, Patiala: Suspension Bridge	Patiala				Sheesh Mahal, Patiala: Suspension Bridge
S-PB-36	Quila Mubarak	Bathinda				Quila Mubarak More images
S-PB-36-a	Quila Mubarak: Darbar Hall	Patiala				Upload Photo
S-PB-36-b	Quila Mubarak: Ran Basa	Patiala				Upload Photo
S-PB-36-c	Quila Mubarak: Lassi Khana	Patiala				Upload Photo
S-PB-36-d	Quila Mubarak: Barracks	Patiala				Upload Photo
S-PB-36-e	Quila Mubarak: Sard Khana	Patiala				Upload Photo
S-PB-36-f	Quila Mubarak: Jilau Khana	Patiala				Upload Photo
S-PB-36-g	Quila Mubarak: Gateway with outer walls	Bathinda				Upload Photo
S-PB-37	Quila Baba Ala Singh Gaddi	Patiala				Upload Photo
S-PB-37-a	Quila Baba Ala Singh Gaddi: Quila Androon	Patiala				Upload Photo
S-PB-37-b	Quila Baba Ala Singh Gaddi: Three painted Chambers	Patiala				Upload Photo
S-PB-37-c	Quila Androon: Court Yard No:1-Gate &Painted Enclosure with Rang mahal Painted chamber	Patiala				Upload Photo
S-PB-37-d	Quila Androon: Court Yard No:2-Moti Mahal Complex	Patiala				Upload Photo
S-PB-37-e	Quila Androon: Court Yard No:3- Charbagh or Bagichi Ghar	Patiala				Upload Photo
S-PB-37-f	Quila Androon: Court Yard No:4 -Long passage gate to Burj	Patiala				Upload Photo
S-PB-37-g	Quila Androon: Court Yard No:5- Sheesh Mahal Court Yard with 3 painted chambers	Patiala				Upload Photo
S-PB-37-h	Quila Androon: Court Yard No:6- Tosha Khana with painted Chamber	Patiala				Upload Photo
S-PB-37-i	Quila Androon: Court Yard No:7- Neem wala Mahal Chandmahal.	Patiala				Upload Photo
S-PB-37-j	Quila Androon: Court Yard No:8 Jails	Patiala				Upload Photo
S-PB-37-k	Quila Androon: Court Yard No:9	Patiala				Upload Photo
S-PB-37-l	Quila Androon: Court Yard No:10	Patiala				Upload Photo
S-PB-37-m	Quila Androon: Burj Baba Ala Singh	Patiala				Upload Photo
S-PB-37-n	Quila Androon: Painted Chamber-Nine Nos	Patiala				Upload Photo
S-PB-38	Samania Gate	Patiala				Samania Gate
S-PB-39	Sunami Gate	Patiala				Sunami Gate
S-PB-40	Sirhindi Gate	Patiala				Upload Photo
S-PB-41	Darshani Gate	Patiala				Upload Photo
S-PB-42	Baradari Moti Bagh	Patiala				Upload Photo
S-PB-43	Painted Chamber of Kali Devi Temple	Patiala				Upload Photo
S-PB-44	Quila Beer, Bahadurgarh (only outer wall & ditch)	Patiala				Upload Photo
S-PB-45	Painted Chamber, Rani Hall, Nabha	Patiala				Upload Photo
S-PB-46	Mound of Ghuram	Patiala				Mound of Ghuram
S-PB-47	Kos Minar, Rajgarh	Patiala				Upload Photo
S-PB-48	Kos Minar, vill.Nausehra	Patiala				Upload Photo
S-PB-49	Samadh Baba Maghi Dass, vill.Chhintanwala, Nabha	Patiala				Upload Photo
S-PB-50	Mound at Chhat, Rajpura	Patiala				Upload Photo
S-PB-51	Mugal Sarai, Shambhu	Patiala				Upload Photo
S-PB-52	Bhikham Shah Da Maqbra, Ghuram	Patiala				Bhikham Shah Da Maqbra, Ghuram
S-PB-53	Tomb of Alawal Khan, Behlolpur	Ropar				Upload Photo
S-PB-54	Tomb of Hussain Khan (Father) Behlolpur	Ropar				Upload Photo
S-PB-55	Tomb of Nawab Bahadur Khan (Son) Behlolpur	Ropar				Upload Photo
S-PB-56	Bauli of vill. Majha Mohewal	Ropar				Upload Photo
S-PB-57	Quila Manauli	Ropar				Quila Manauli
S-PB-58	Diwan Khana	Sangrur				Upload Photo
S-PB-59	Marble Baradari including Tank	Sangrur				Upload Photo
S-PB-60	Samadh and Bauli, Bagrian	Sangrur				Upload Photo
S-PB-61	Ancestral House of Shaheed Udham Singh	Sunam				Upload Photo
S-PB-62	Shalimar Gardens, Kapurthala	Kapurthala				Shalimar Gardens, Kapurthala
S-PB-63	Durbar Hall, Kapurthala	Kapurthala				Durbar Hall, Kapurthala

== See also ==
- List of State Protected Monuments in India for other State Protected Monuments in India
- List of Monuments of National Importance in Punjab
