= Tombs of Ustad-Shagird, Sirhind =

Monument in Fatehgarh Sahib district, Punjab, India

Tombs of Ustad — Shagird
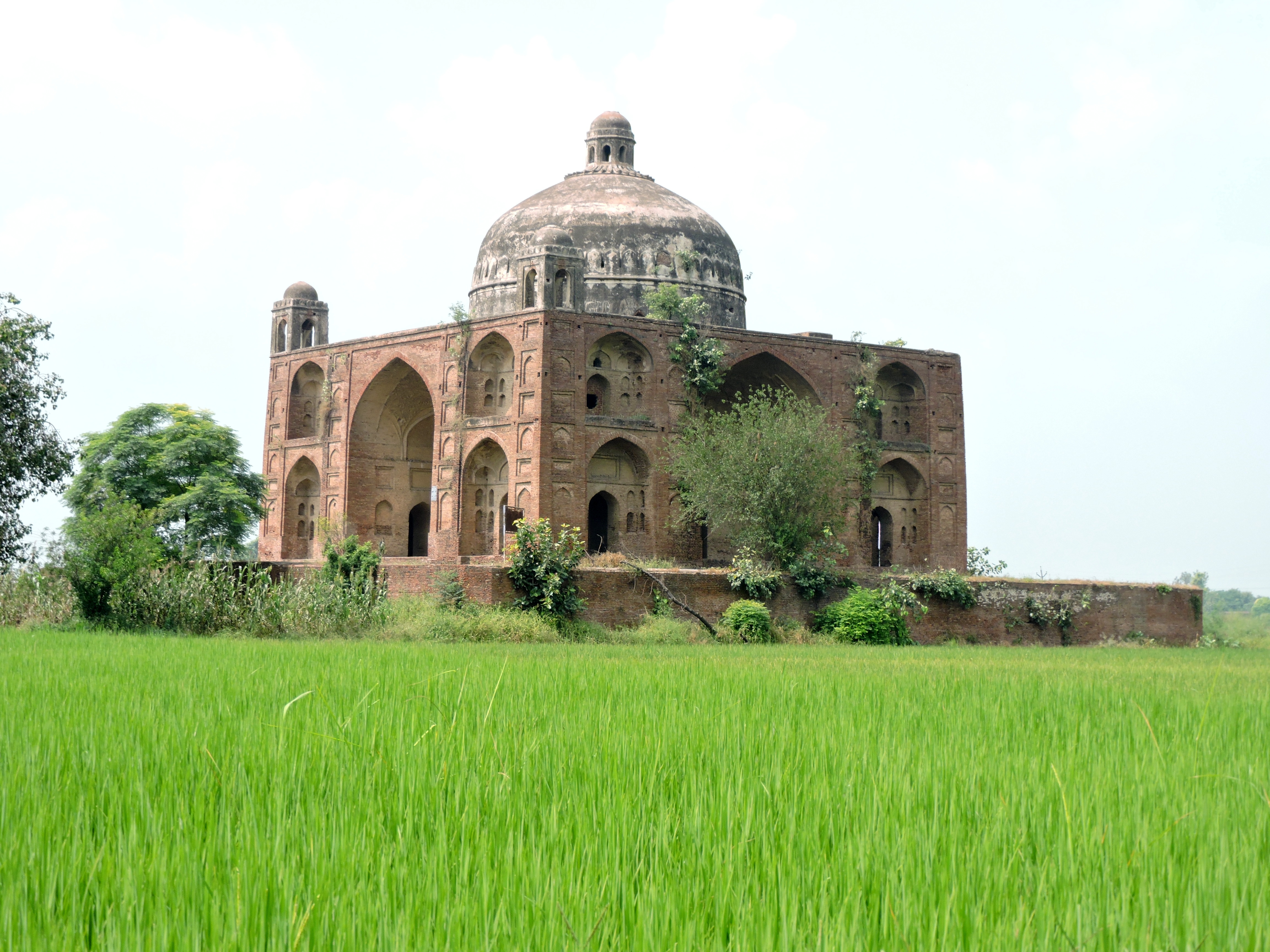
- Location: Punjab, India

Site notes
- Architectural style: Mughal Architecture

Tombs of Ustad – Shagird are Mughal period monuments situated in village Talania of Sirhind-Fategarh, Punjab, India. Sirhind was a popular town during Mughal period. It was situated on the Delhi to Lahore Highway. In 1710, Banda Singh Bahadur and his Sikh army destroyed the city of Sirhind completely and Wazir Khan the governor, was killed in the Battle of Chappar Chiri. But some of these monuments like Tombs of Ustad – Shagird survived.

== History ==
Tombs of Ustad – Shagird, are historical buildings built in memory of Ustad Syad Khan who was a great architect and builder of that period. The tomb of shagird is built as a memorial to Khawaja Khan who also was a well known architect. In Hindi and Urdu, Ustad means teacher and Shagird means student. In this case Ustad Syad Khan was the teacher of Khawaja Khan that is why these tombs are known as Tombs of Ustad – Shagird or Ustad Di Mazar Shahgird Di Mazar in local language.

== Features ==
These monuments are at a distance of 2.5 kilometers from Rauza Sharif another well known monuments of the area.

== Gallery ==
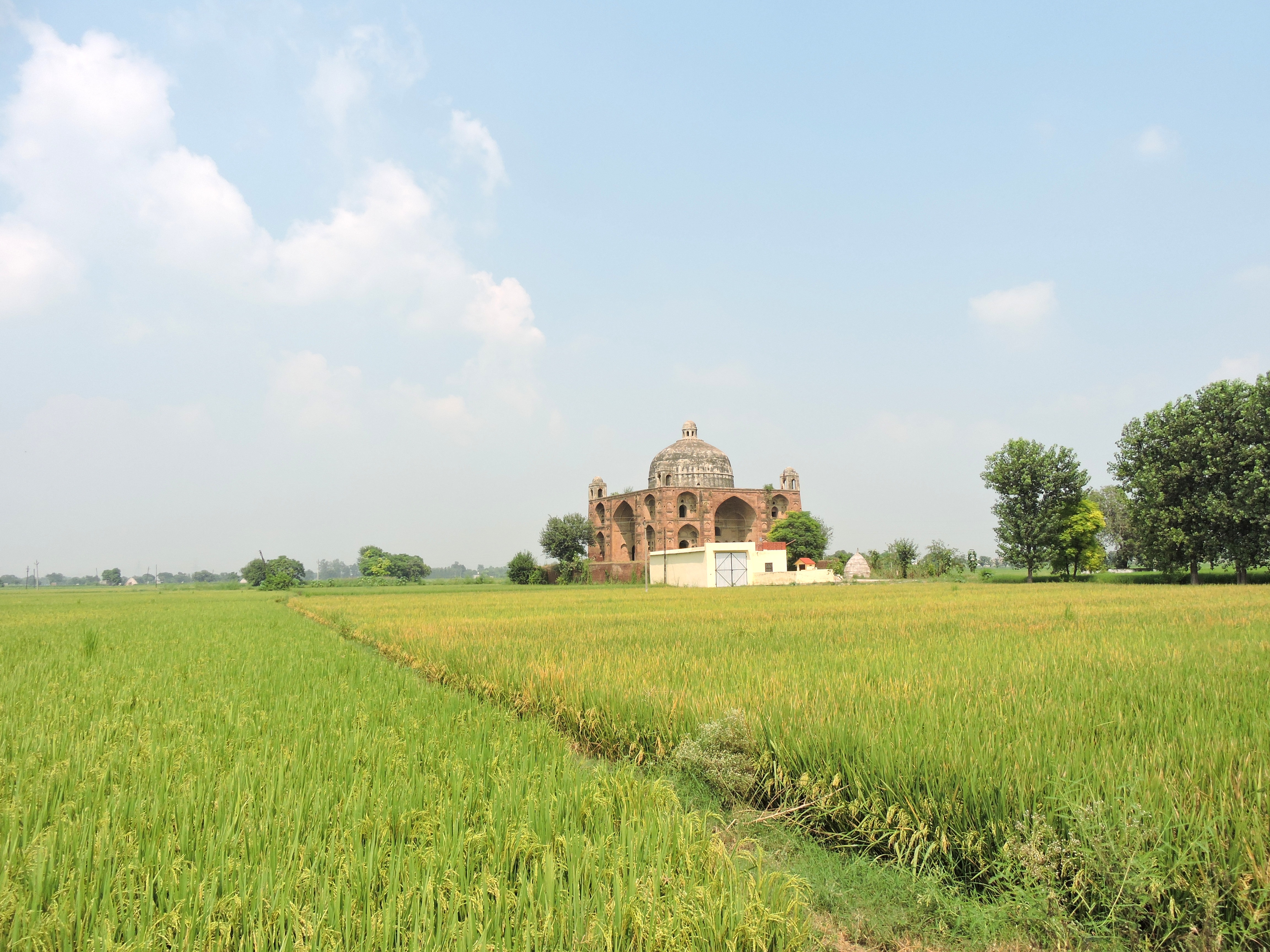
Landscape around Tomb of Ustad.

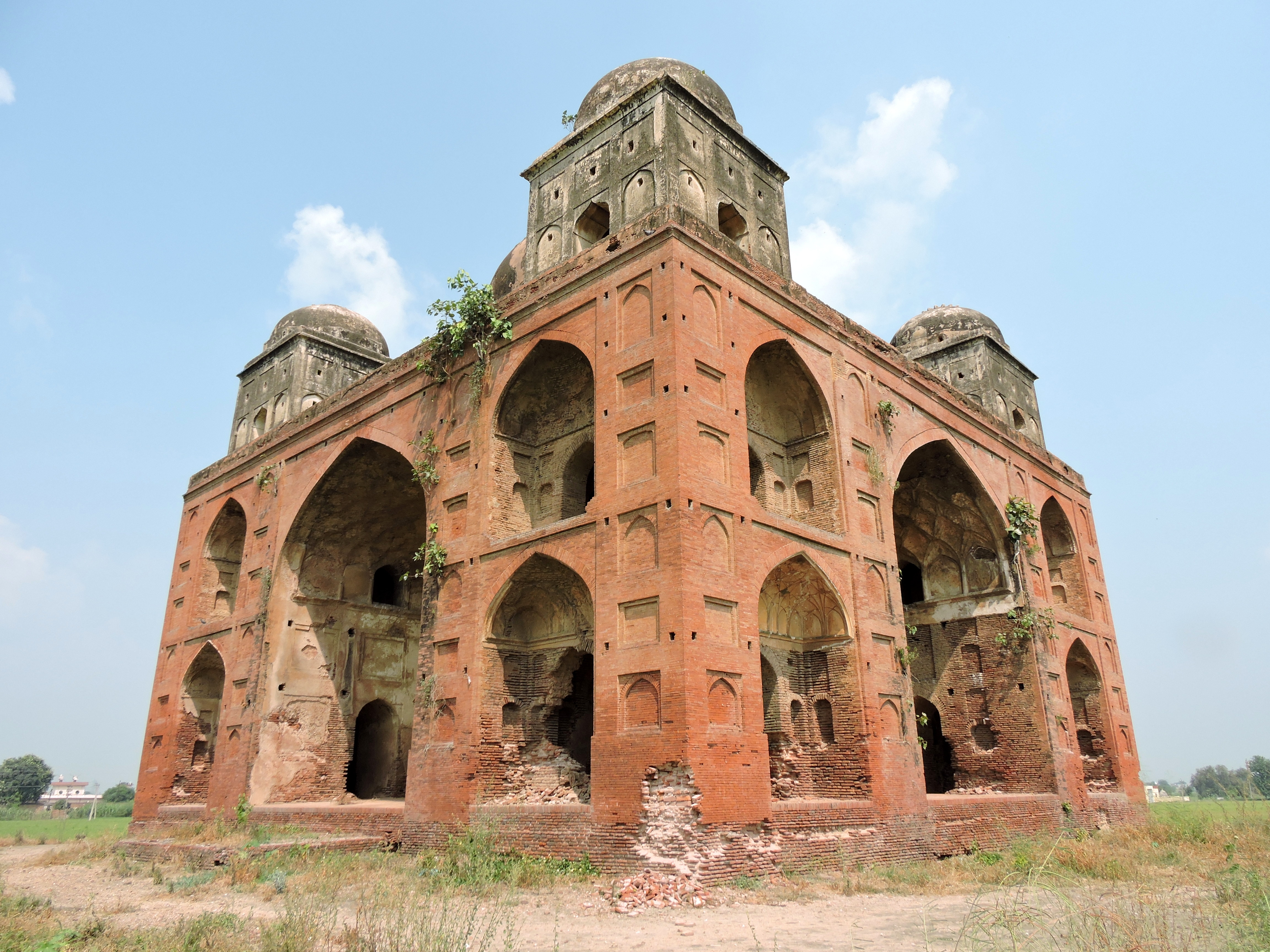
Entrance and left side view of tomb of Shagird.

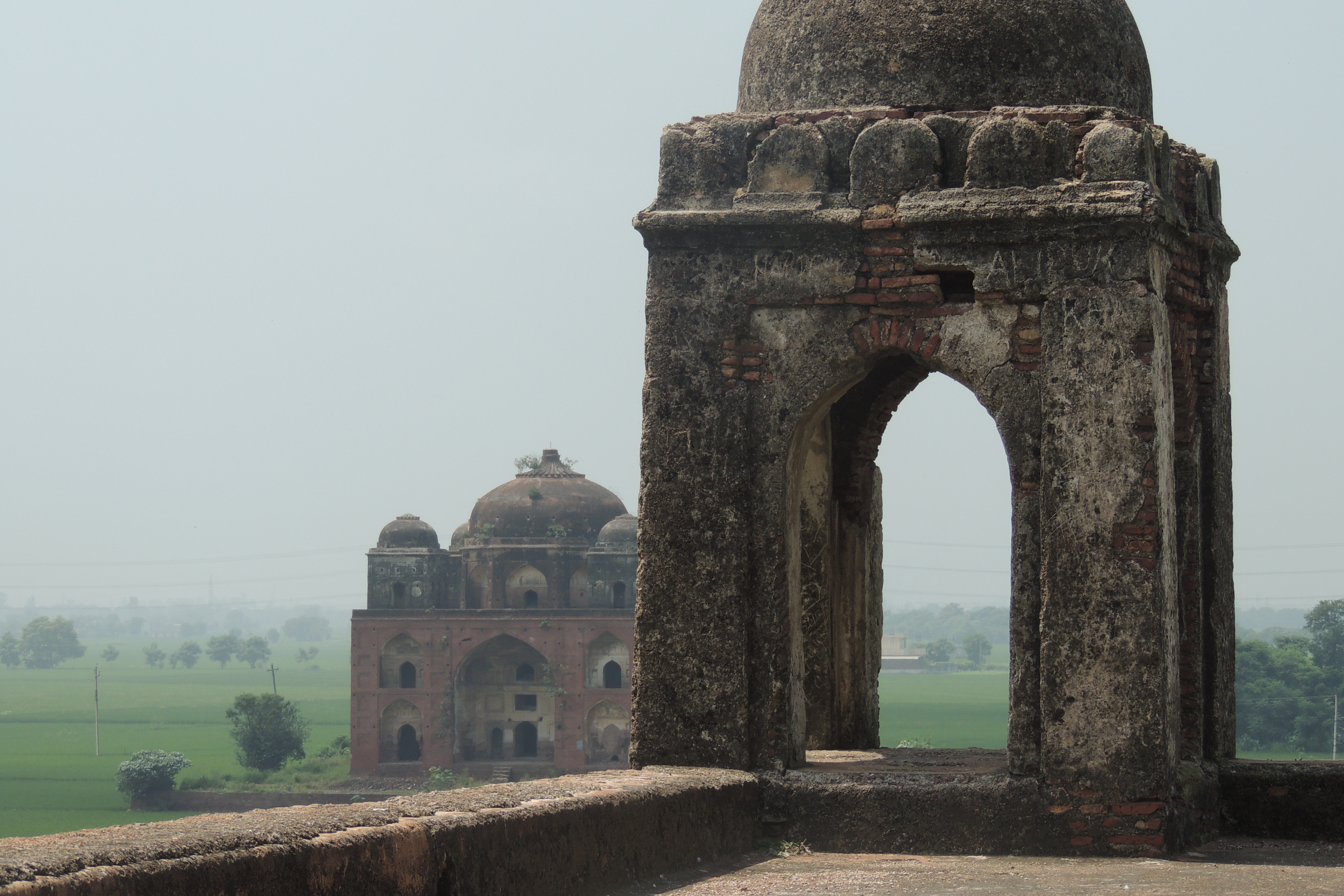
Tomb of Shagird a view from Ustad Tomb

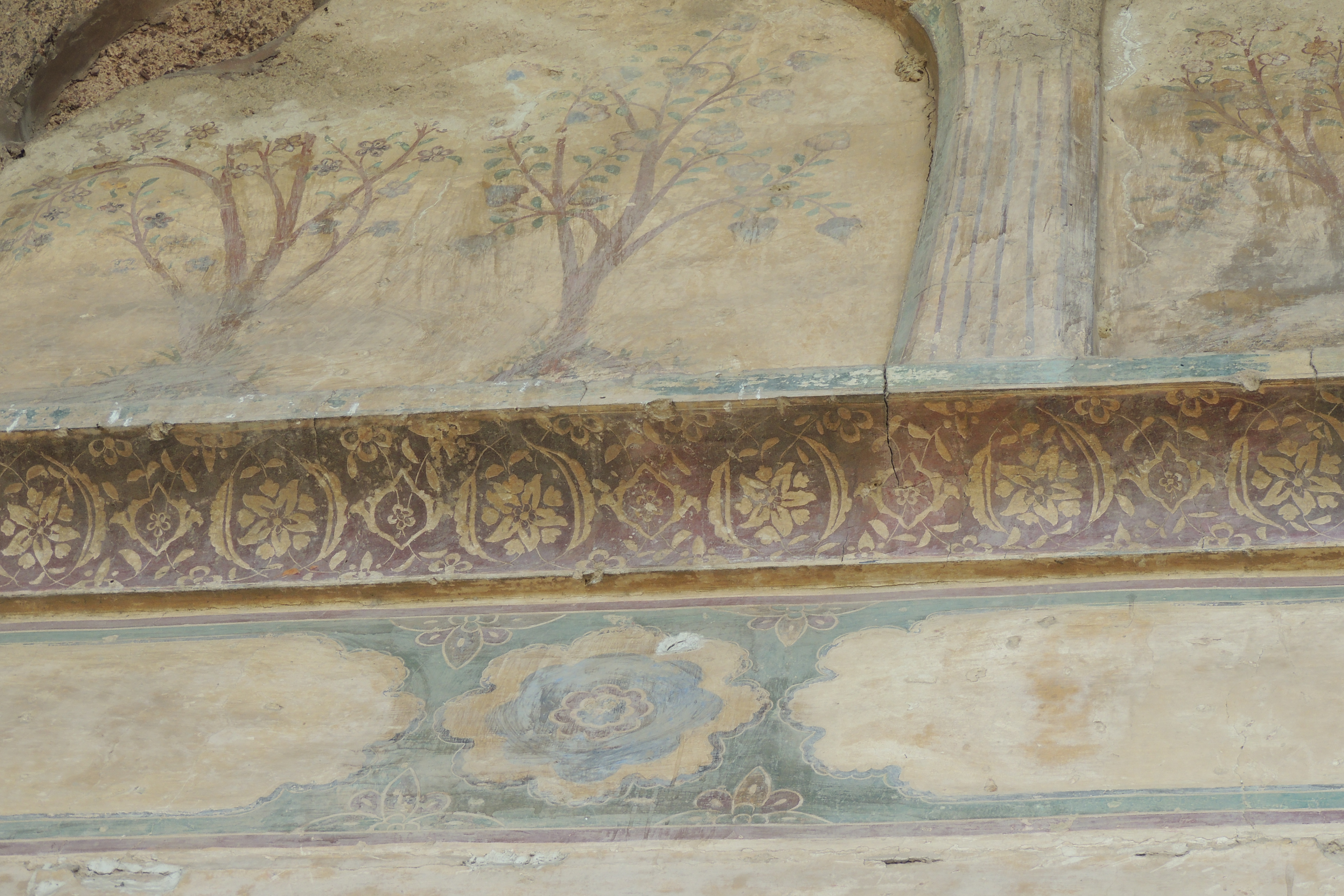
Old Painting on the walls of Tomb

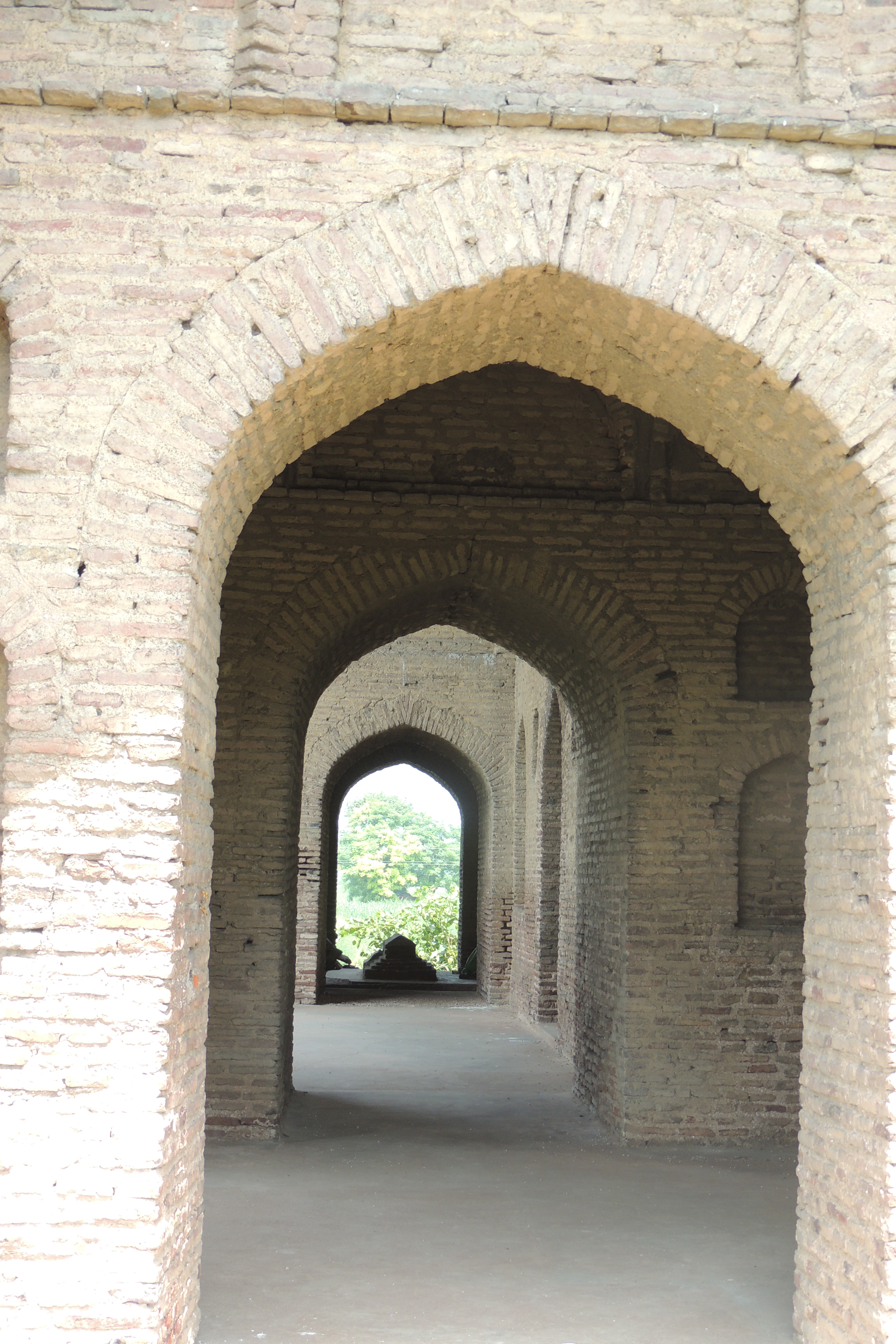
Internal View of Tomb

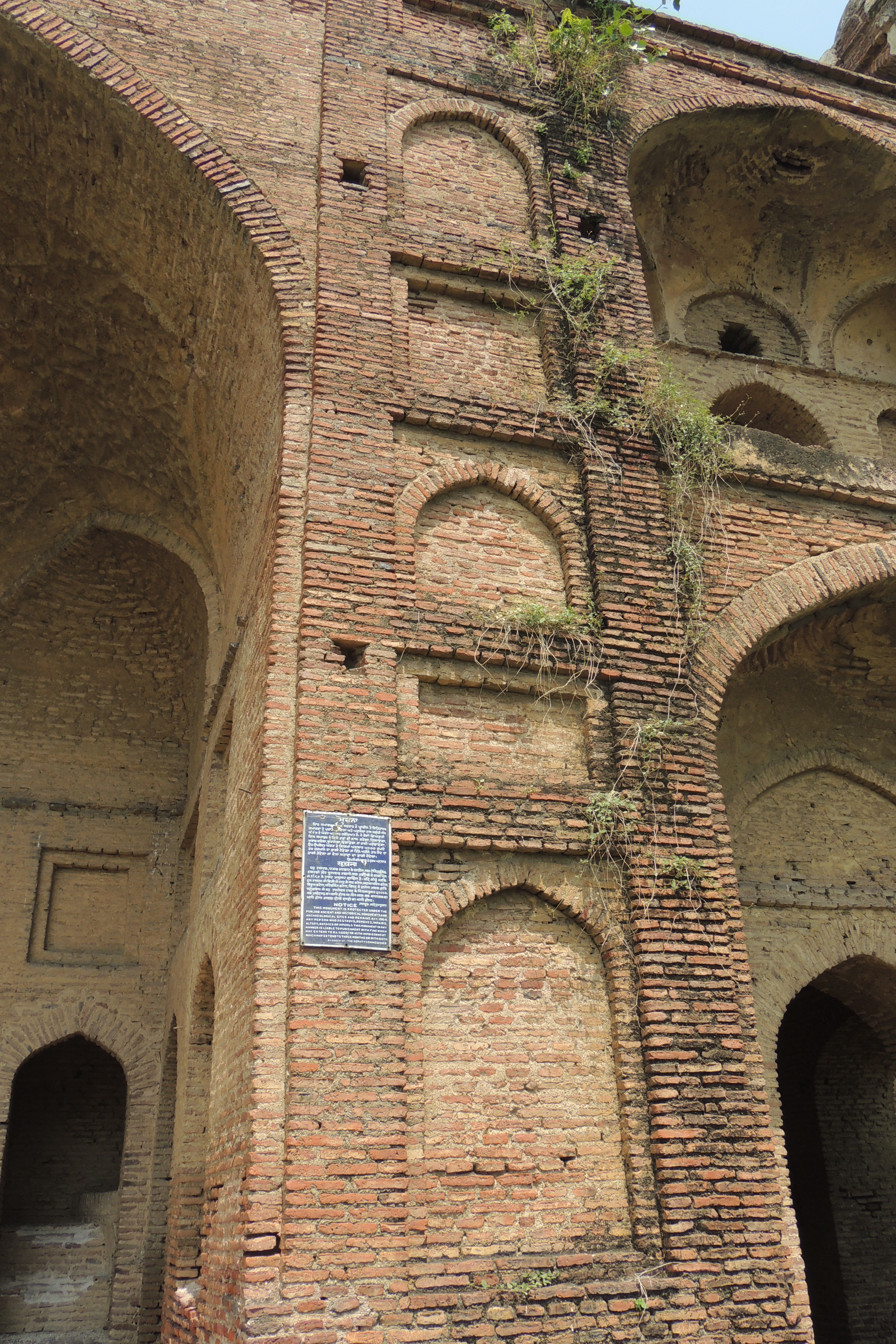
Front side of Tomb

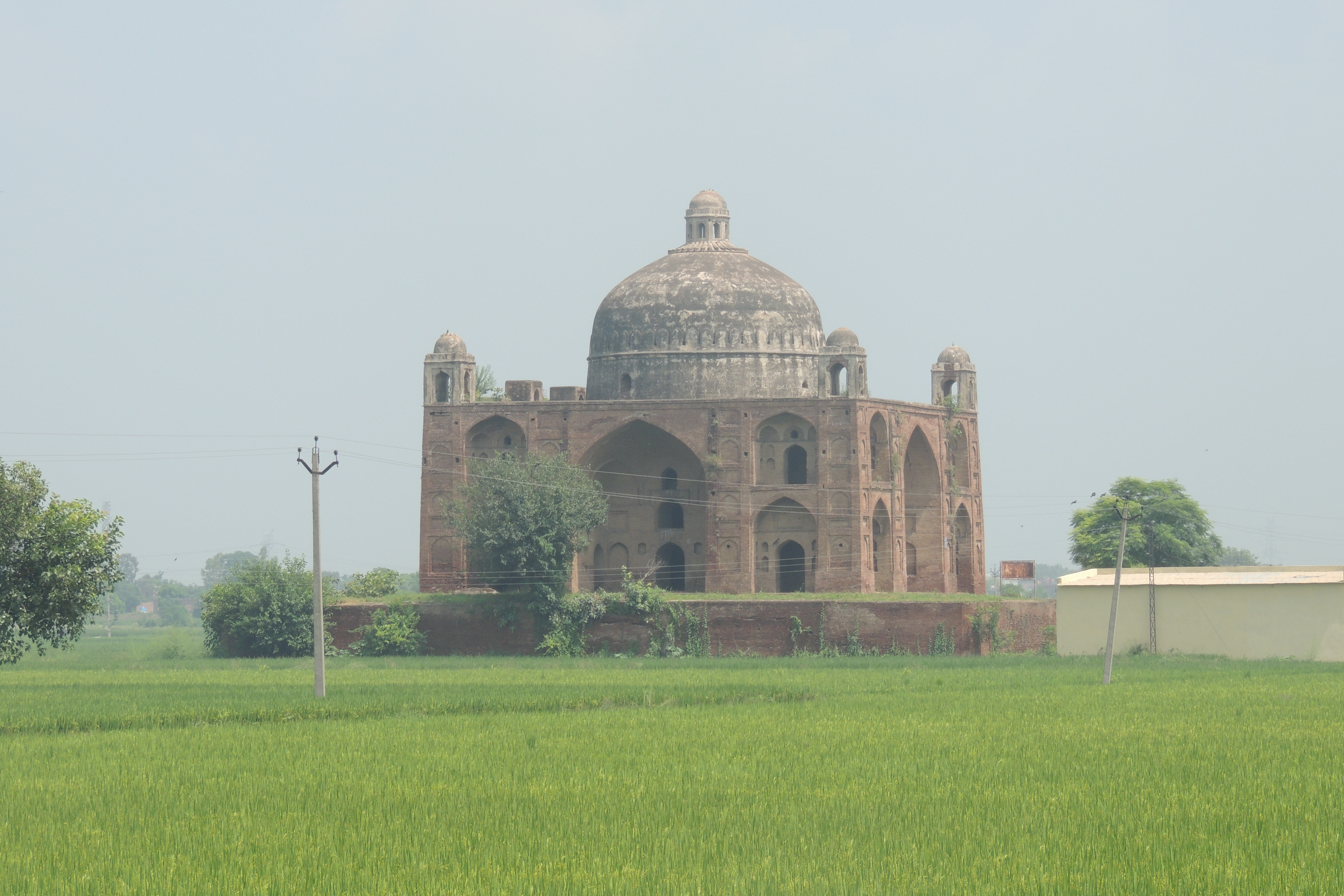
Full View Tomb of Ustad
