= Kotla Suleman =

- village
- Nickname: ਝੁੱਗੀਆਂ
- Location in Punjab, India Kotla Suleman (India)
- Coordinates: 30.45°N 76.26°E
- Country: India
- State: Punjab
- District: Fatehgarh Sahib

Area
  - Total: 12 km^{2} (4.6 sq mi)

Population (2011)
  - Total: 1,500
  - Density: 120/km^{2} (320/sq mi)

Languages
  - Official: Punjabi
- Time zone: UTC+5:30 (IST)
- Telephone code: 01763
- Vehicle registration: PB23
- Nearest city: Sirhind
- Literacy: 78%%
- Lok Sabha constituency: Fatehgarh Sahib
- Vidhan Sabha constituency: Sirhind

Kotla Suleman is a small village in Sirhind, Fatehgarh Sahib district, Punjab, India. It is located 2 kilometres to the south of the district headquarters, Fatehgarh Sahib, and 45 kilometres from the state capital, Chandigarh.

Kotla Suleman is surrounded by Khamano Tehsil towards North, Fatehgarh Sahib Tehsil towards North, Bassi Pathana Tehsil towards North, Amloh Tehsil towards west .

Khanna, Morinda, Rajpura, Kharar are the nearby Cities to Kotla Suleman.

This Place is in the border of the Fatehgarh Sahib District and Ludhiana District. Ludhiana District Khanna is west towards this place.

== How to reach Kotla Suleman ==
Sirhind Jn Rail Way Station, Fatehgarh Sahib Rail Way Station are the very nearby railway stations to Kotla Suleman. However Patiala Rail Way Station is major railway station 35 KM near to Kotla Suleman.

Colleges near Kotla Suleman:

1. Mata Gujri College. 2. Baba Banda Singh Bahadur Engineering College. 3. Sri Guru Granth Sahib World University. 4. Lincoln Law College.
