= Sirhind =

- City
- Interactive map of Sirhind
- Coordinates: 30°37′N 76°23′E
- Country: India
- State: Punjab
- District: Fatehgarh Sahib

Population (2013)
  - Total: 60,852

Languages
  - Official: Punjabi
  - Native: Puadhi
- Time zone: UTC+05:30 (IST)
- Vehicle registration: PB-23

Sirhind is a twin city of Fatehgarh Sahib in Punjab, India. It is hosts the municipal council of Fatehgarh Sahib district.

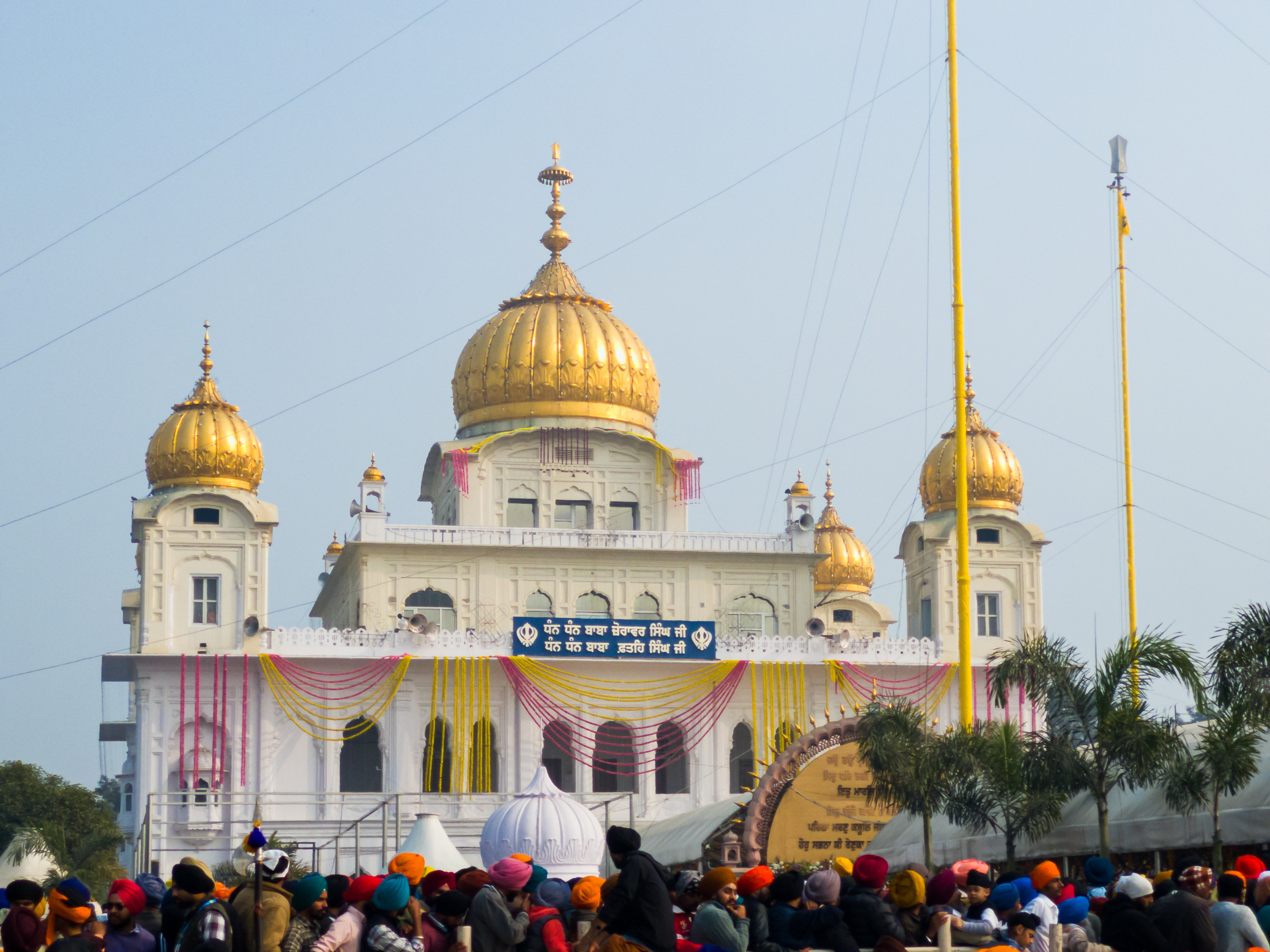
Gurudwara Fatehgarh Sahib

== Demographics ==
In the 2011 census Sirhind-Fatehgarh had a population of 60852. Males constituted 54% of the population and females 46%. Sirhind-Fatehgarh had an average literacy rate of 90%, higher than the national average of 74%: male literacy is 84%, and female literacy was 80%. 12% of the population was under 6 years of age.

== Etymology ==
According to popular notion, Sirhind, comes from 'Sar-i hind', meaning the Frontier of Hind, as the Mughal emperors saw it as the 'gateway to Hindustan'.

== History ==
In his Sanskrit treatise, Brihat Samhita, Varahamihira (505–587) mentions the city as 'Satudar Desh'. Later it was inhabited by a tribe of Sairindhas Aryans, leading to its present name. According to Huan Tsang, the Chinese traveller who visited India during the seventh century, Sirhind was the capital of the district of Shitotulo, or Shatadru (the present day River Sutlej).

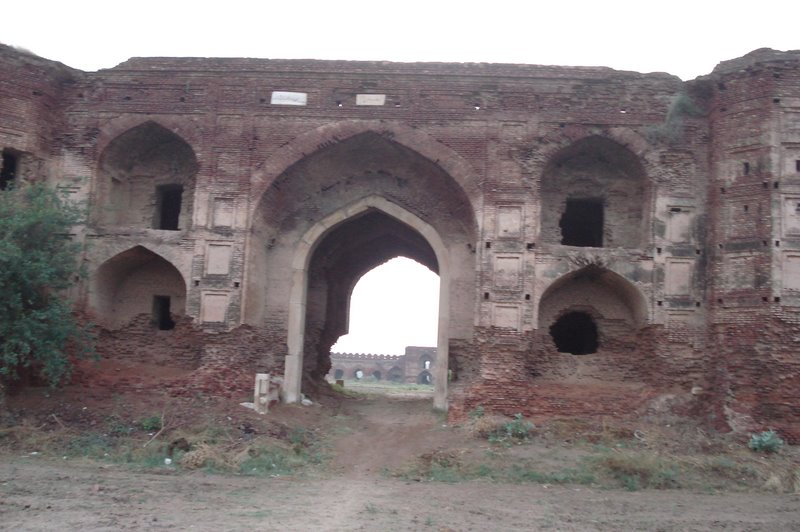
Entrance to the Ramgarh Fort near Sirhind

In the 12th century, Sirhind came under the rule of the Hindu Chauhan Rajputs of Delhi. During the rule of Prithvi Raj Chauhan (1168–1192), the Hindu Rajput ruler of Delhi, it became his military outpost. The city was besieged by Jasrat Khokhar in 1421. However, he failed to conquer it. In 1431, Jasrat Khokhar allied with Sikander Tohfa, the governor of Lahore, against Afghans of Sirhind. They managed to capture Sirhind, but the Afghans had already left and moved towards the hills, where many of them were massacred by Jasrat Khokhar and Sikander.

It became a provincial capital during the Mughal Empire, controlling the Lahore–Delhi highway. During the Mughal era, Sirhind was the name for Malwa, the area's capital city. Sirhind was the headquarters of the Mughal administration in Eastern Punjab. Many European travelers describe its splendours, and it developed into a cultural center.

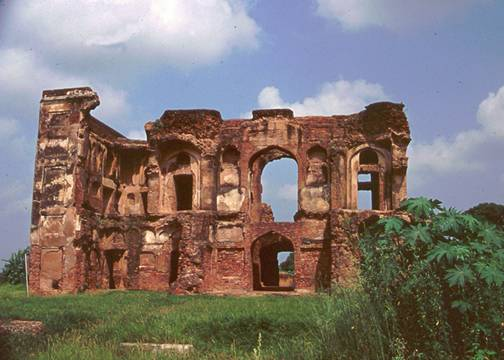
Ruins of Daulat Khana-E-Khas at Aam Khas Bagh', built by most probably, Sultan Hafiz Rakhna, during the reign of emperor Akbar

Sirhind was known for dozens of saints, scholars, poets, historians, calligraphers and scribes who lived there. This city is famous to Muslims for Great saint Imām-e-Rabbānī Shaykh Ahmad al-Farūqī al-Sirhindī (R.) (1564–1624). He was an Indian Islamic scholar of Arab origin, a Hanafi jurist, and a prominent member of the Naqshbandī Sufi order. Many buildings survive from this period, including Aam Khas Bagh; it is said that in its heyday, the city had 360 mosques, gardens, tombs, caravansarais and wells.

== Education ==
=== University ===
- Sri Guru Granth Sahib World University

=== General degree colleges ===
- Mata Gujri College, Fatehgarh Sahib.
- Saffron College for Girls, Kotla Bajwara

=== Law College ===
- Lincoln College of Law, Sirhind

=== Polytechnic College ===
- Baba Banda Singh Bahadur Polytechnic College

=== Teacher Training College ===
- Lincoln College of Education, Sirhind

=== CISCE affiliated school ===
- Baalak Yesu Convent School

=== Punjab School Education Board affiliated schools ===
- Ashoka Sen. Sec. School, Sirhind
- Baba Dyalpuri Sen.sec.school, Sirhind
- BZSFS.SEN.SEC PUBLIC SCHOOL, Fatehgarh Sahib
- Dyanand High School, Sirhind
- Government girls senior secondary school, Sirhind Mandi
- Mata Sundri Public School, Fatehgarh Sahib
- M G Ashoka Girls College, Sirhind
- Rana Munshi Ram Sarvhitkari school, Sirhind
- Sirhind Public School, Sirhind

=== Central Board Of Secondary education (CBSE) affiliated schools ===
- St.Mary's School, Mahadian, Fatehgarh Sahib
- Divine Light International school
- Jesus Saviour's School
- Saffron City School
- Garden Valley International School
- Greenfields School

=== Other ===
- Lakshya Computer Education, Sirhind Mandi

== Historical and religious places in Sirhind-Fatehgarh Sahib ==
- Gurudwara Fatehgarh Sahib
- Gurdwara Jyoti Sarup
- Dashnami Akhara
- Gurdwara Shahid Ganj
- Gurdwara Patshahi Chevin
- Rauza Sharif (Shrine of Syed Ahmad Sirhindi)
- Tomb of Ustad and Shagird
- Tomb of Mir-I-Miran, Sirhind
- Aam Khas Bagh, Sirhind
- Mata Shri Chakreshwari Devi Jain Temple Village Attewali (Sirhind)
- Gurdwara moti ram mehra ji
- Jahaji Haveli, Haveli of Diwan Todar Mal
- Dera Baba Biram Dass Ji (VPO Badhouchhi Kalan)
- Baba Rodu Ram Ji (VPO Nandpur Kalaur)

== Gallery ==

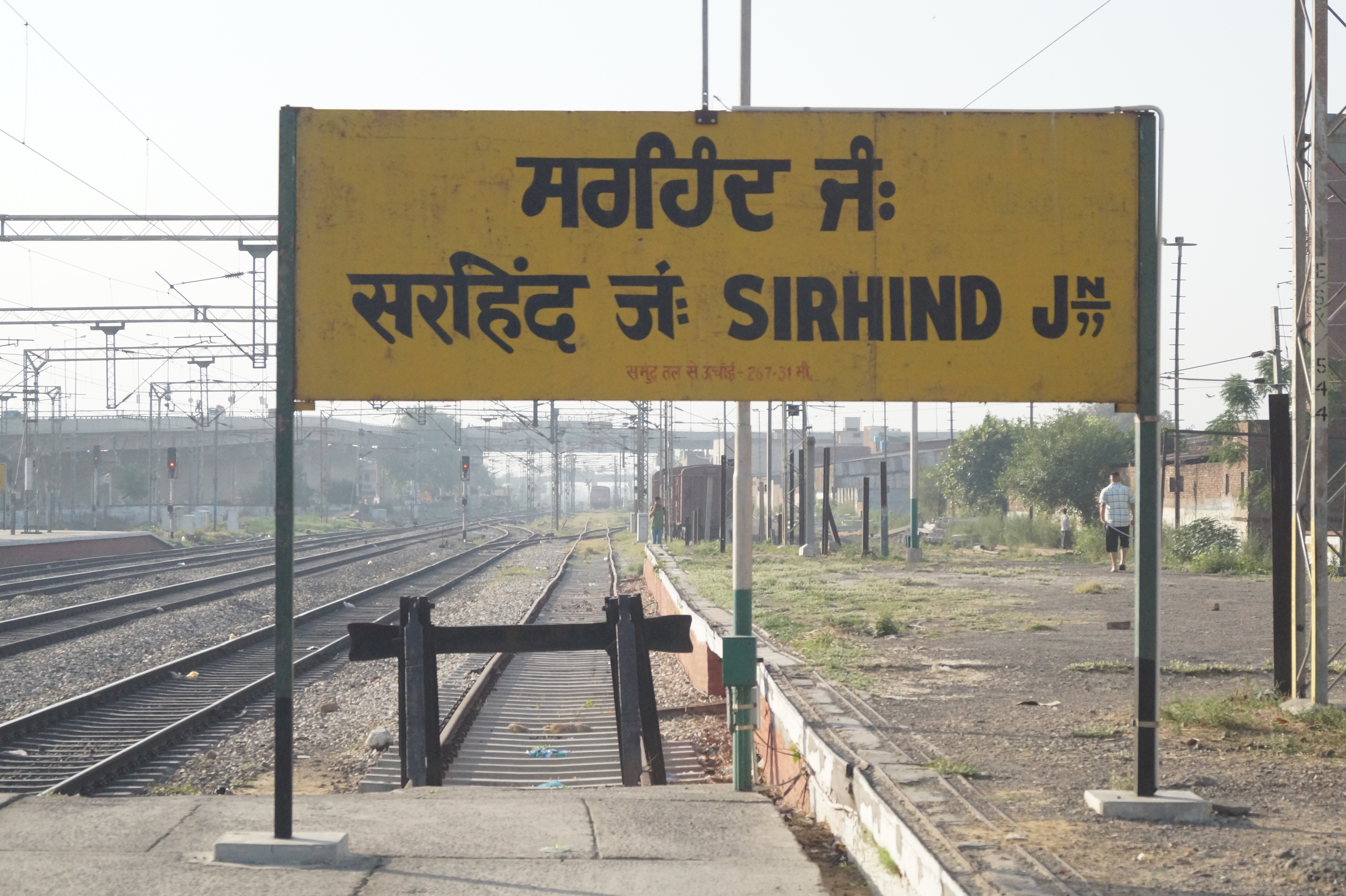

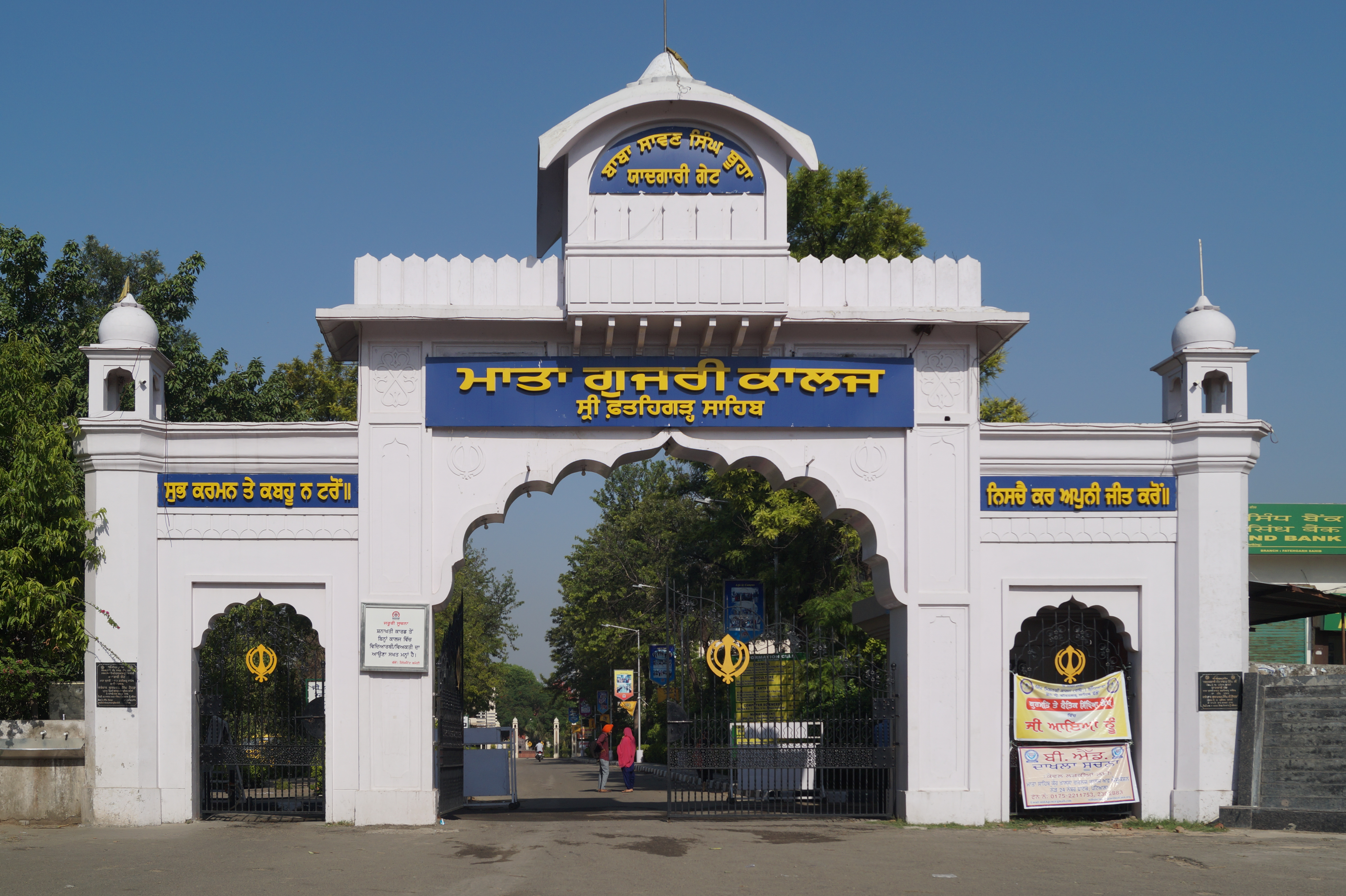

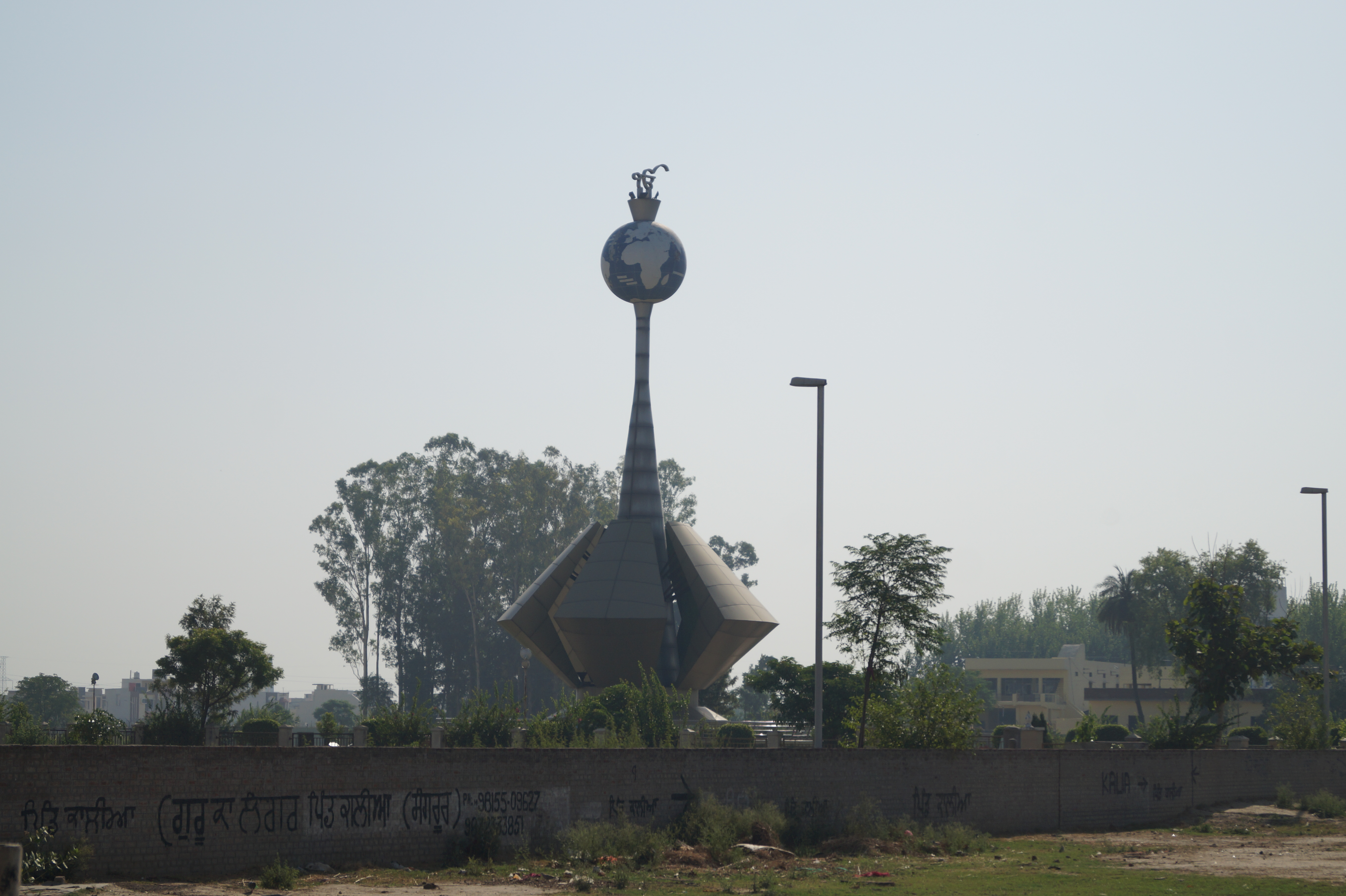

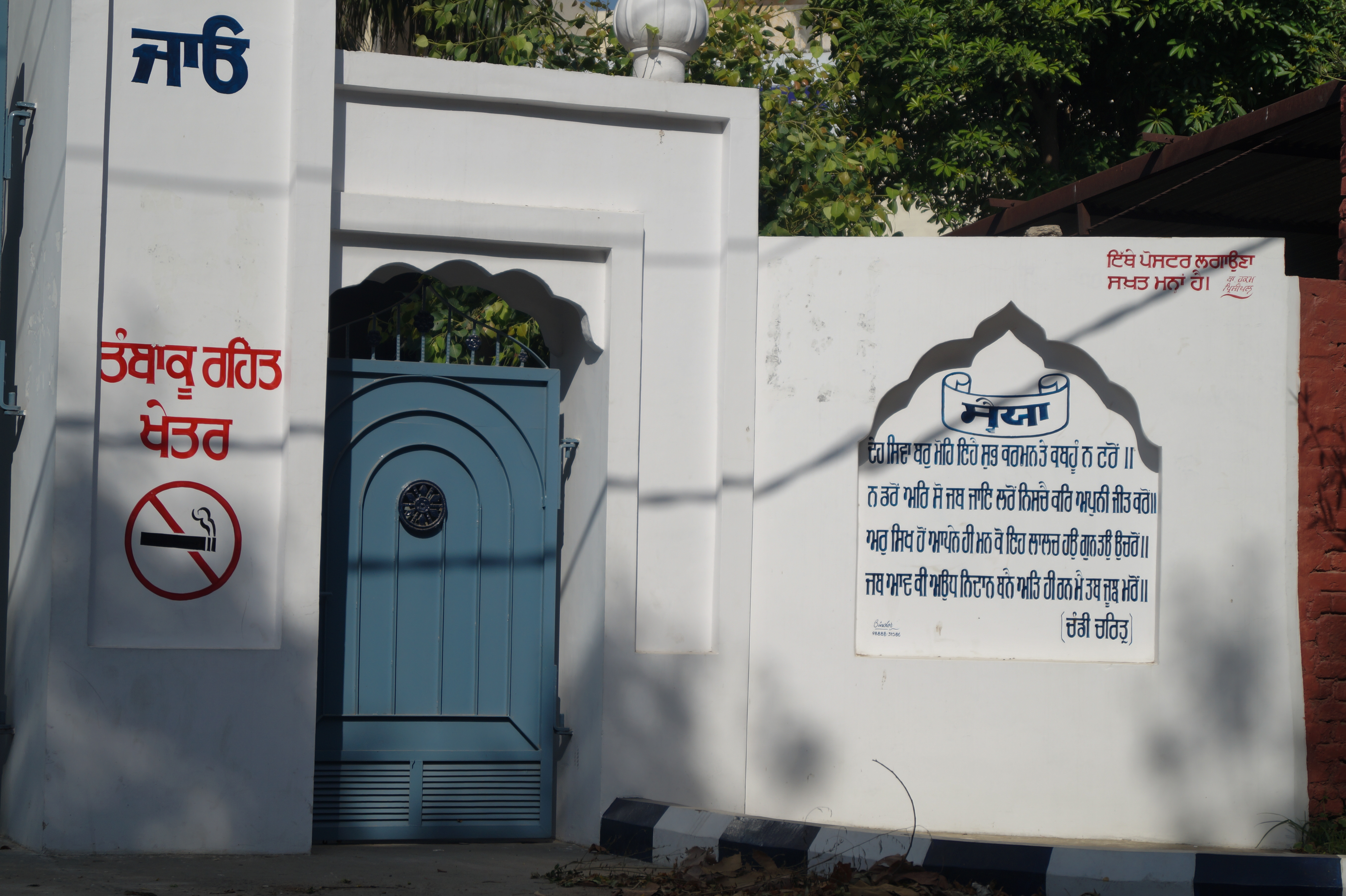

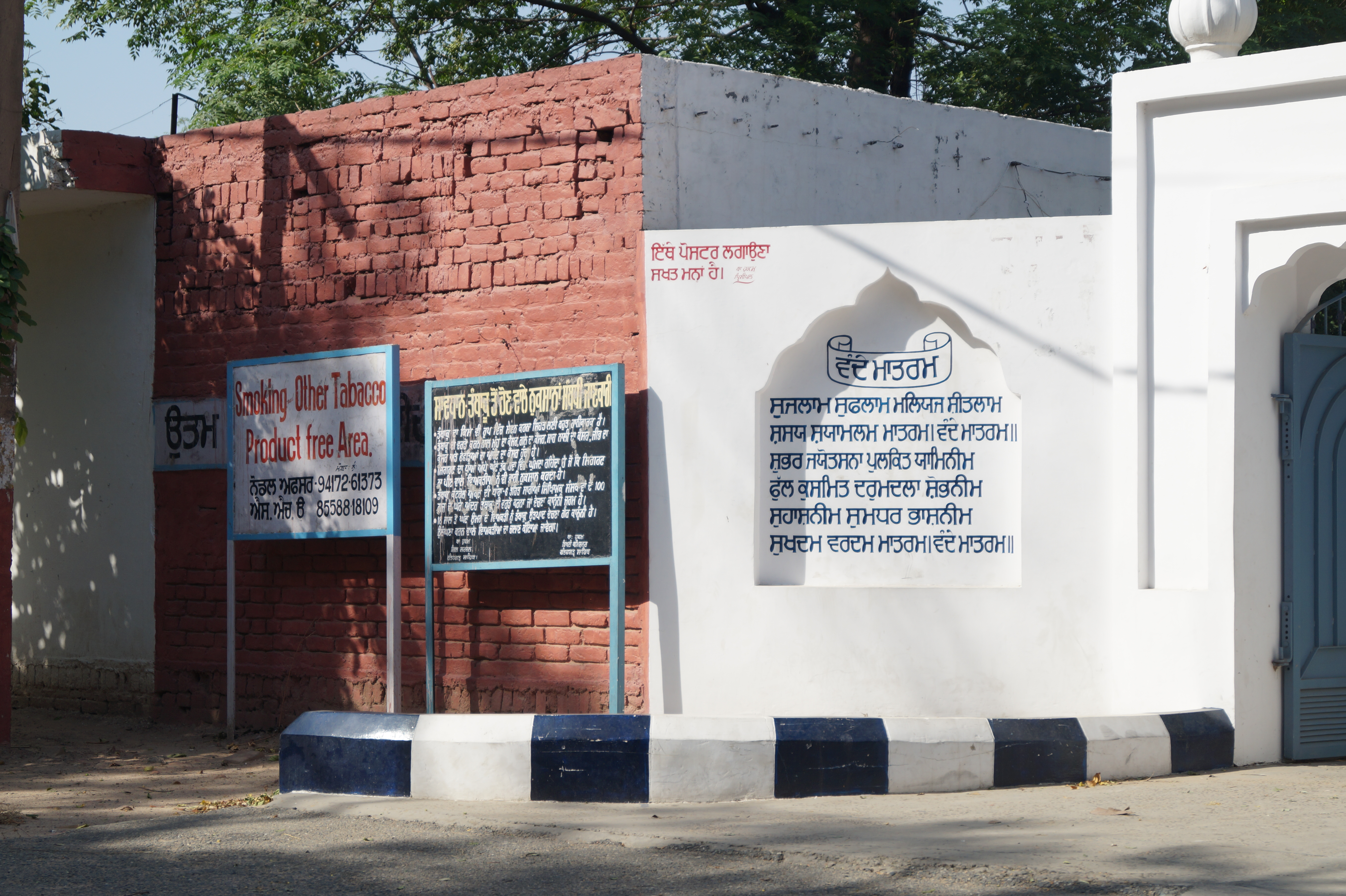

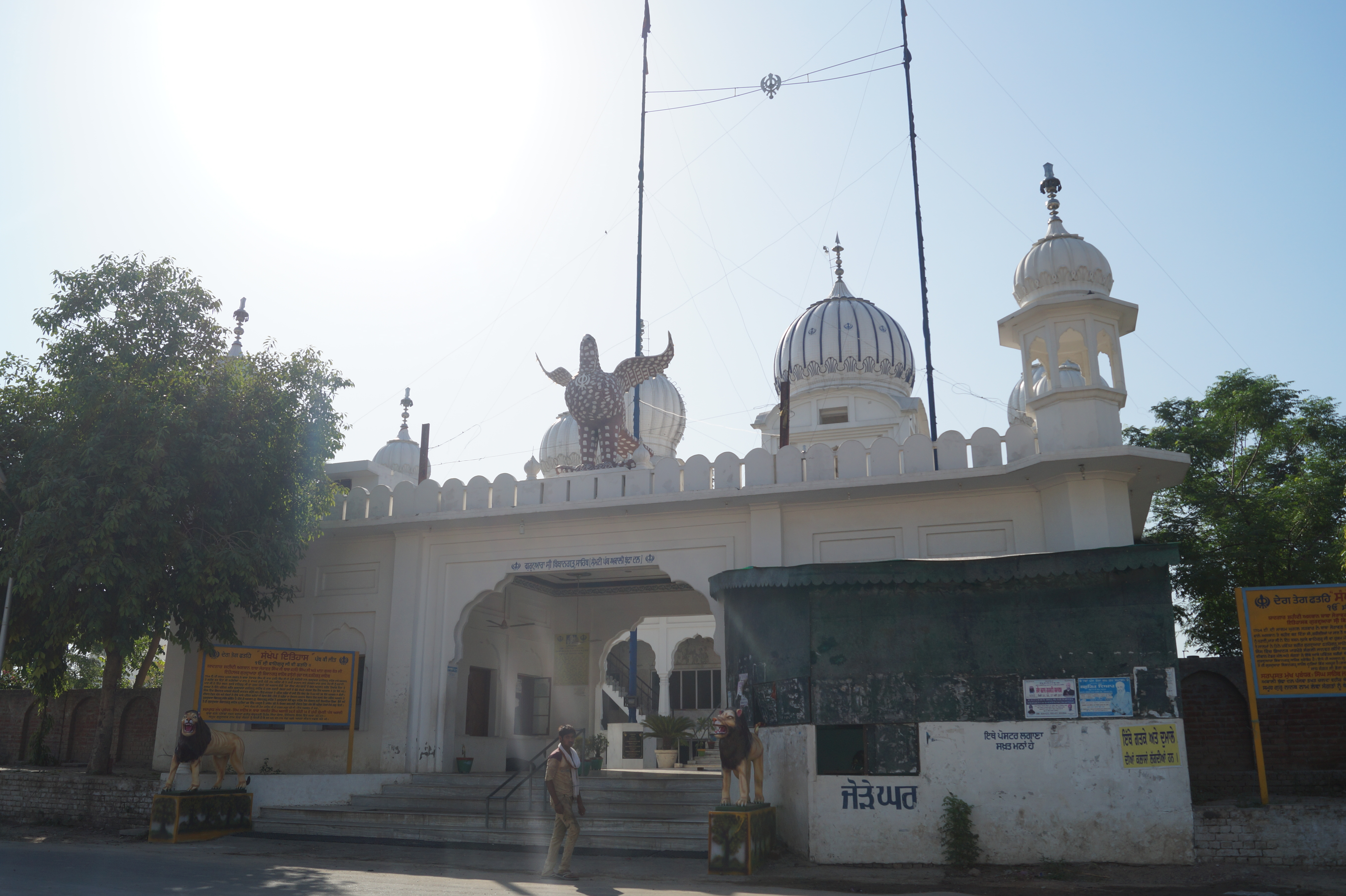

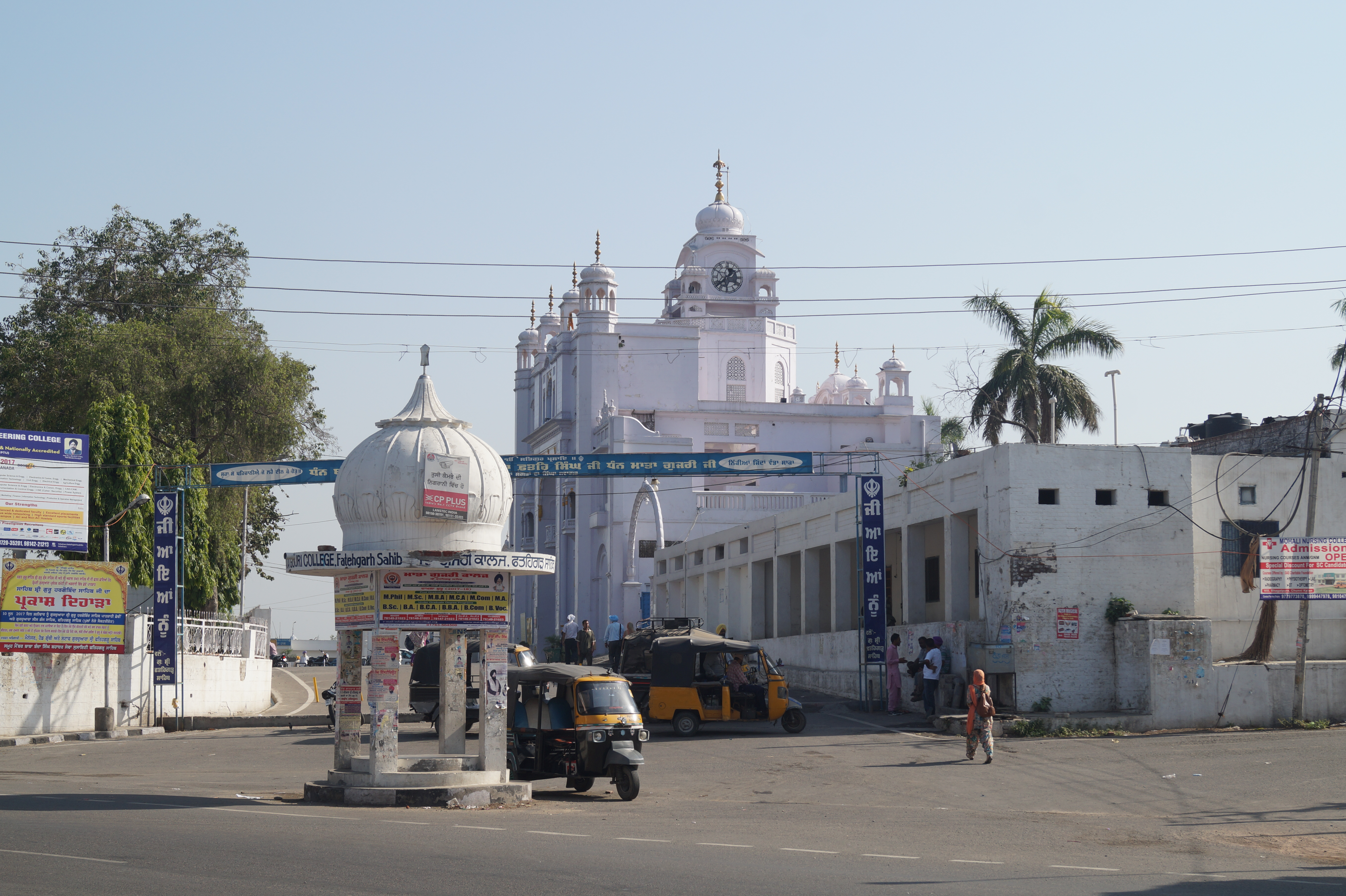

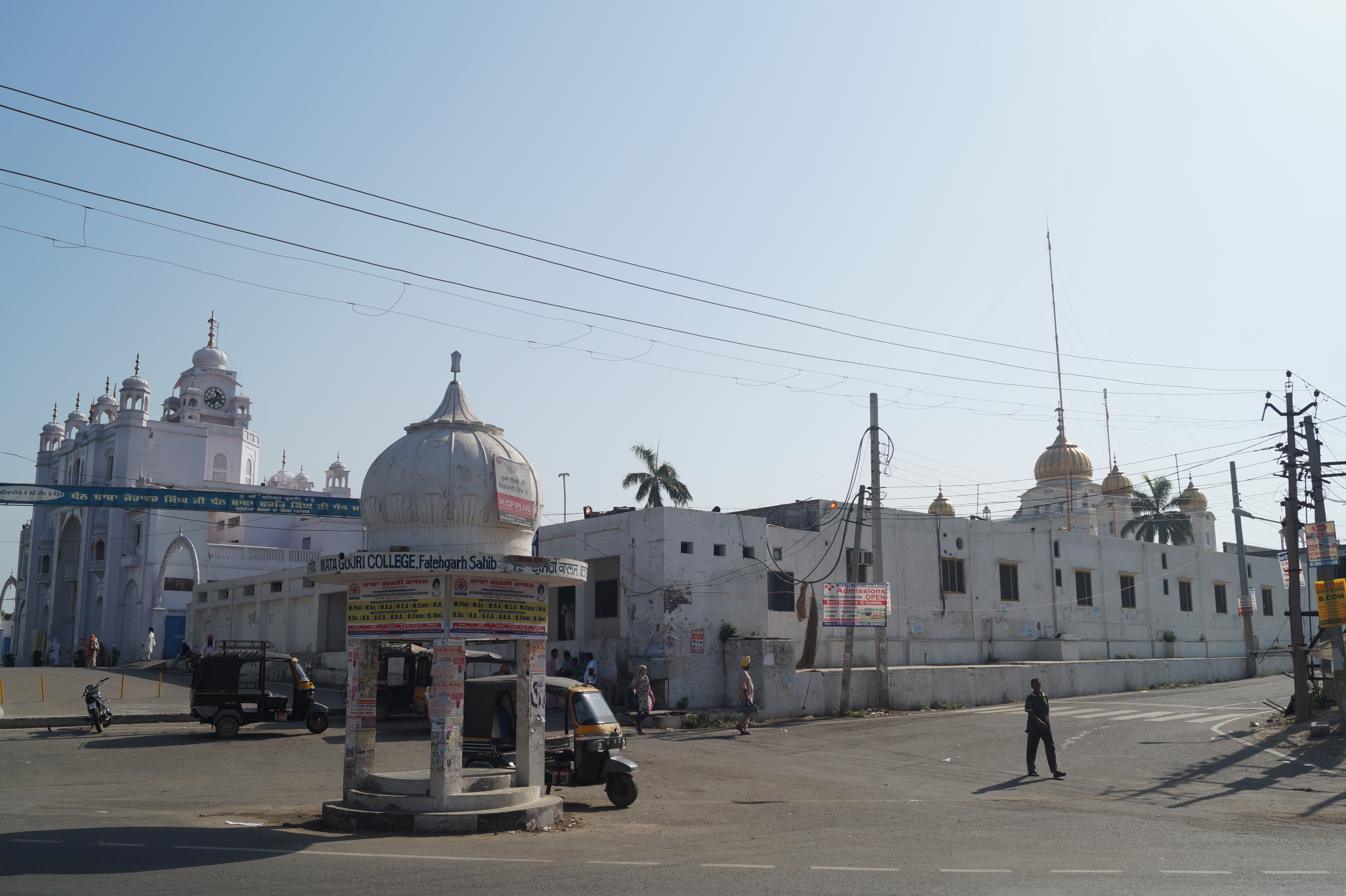

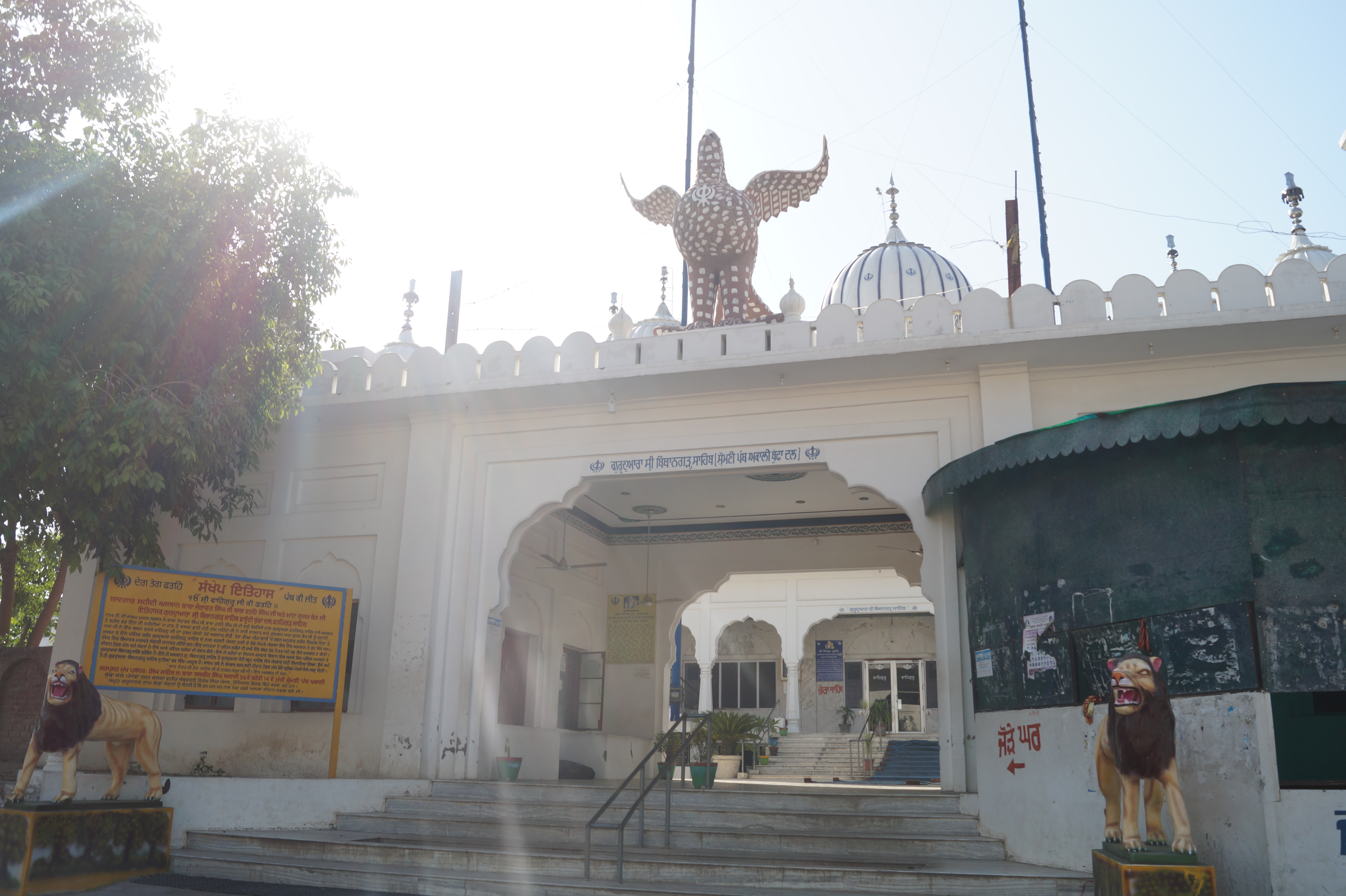

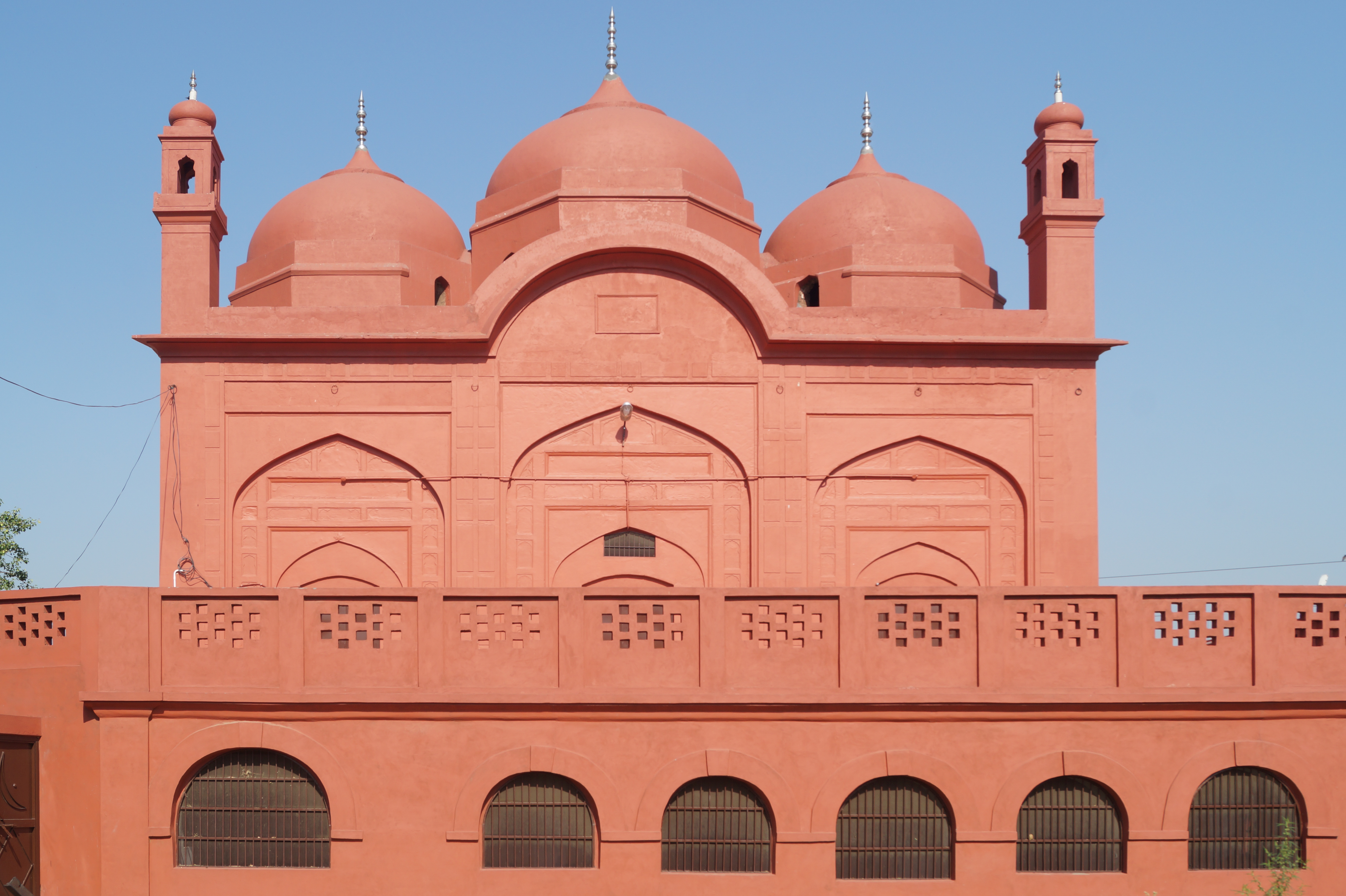

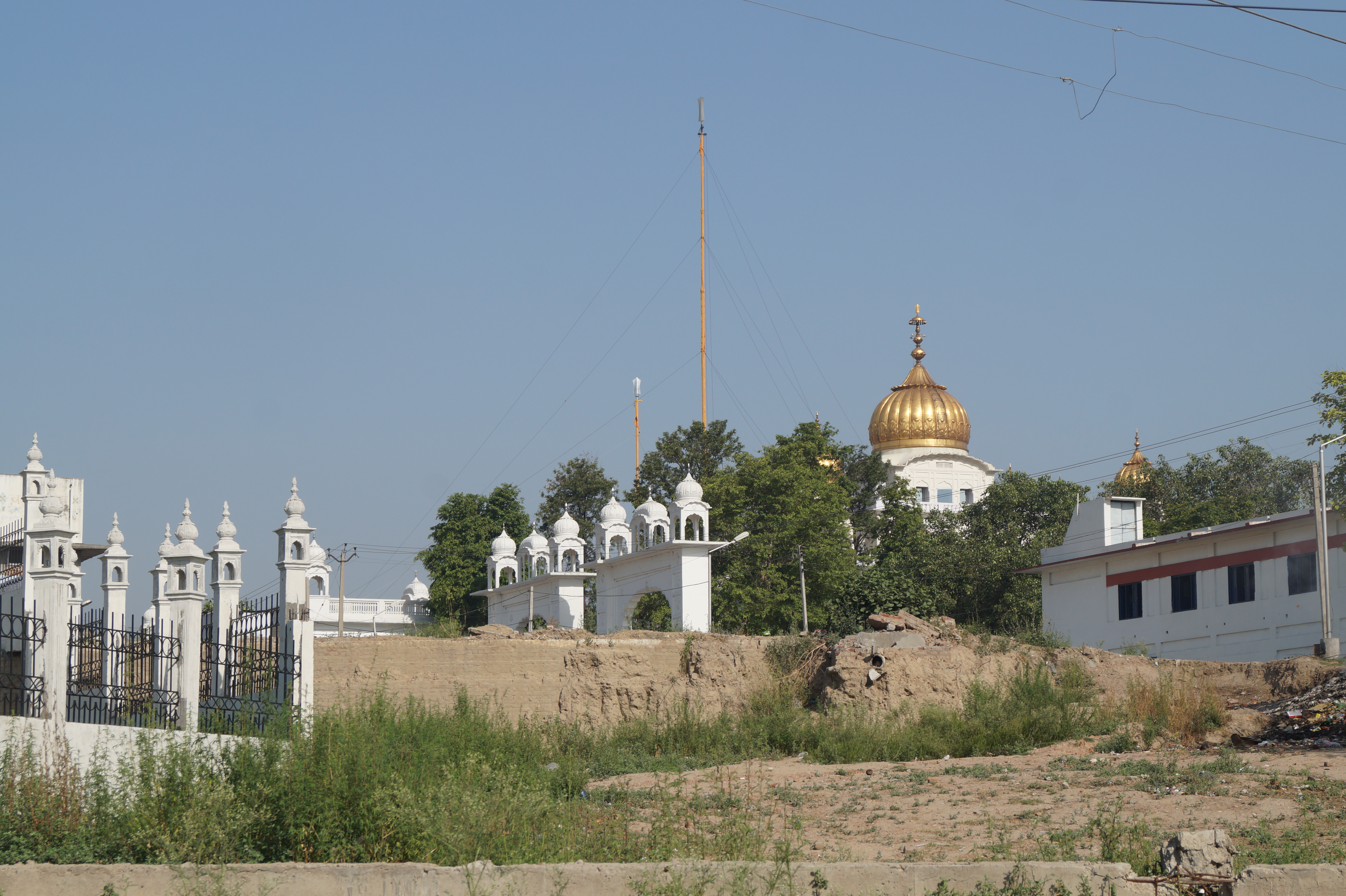

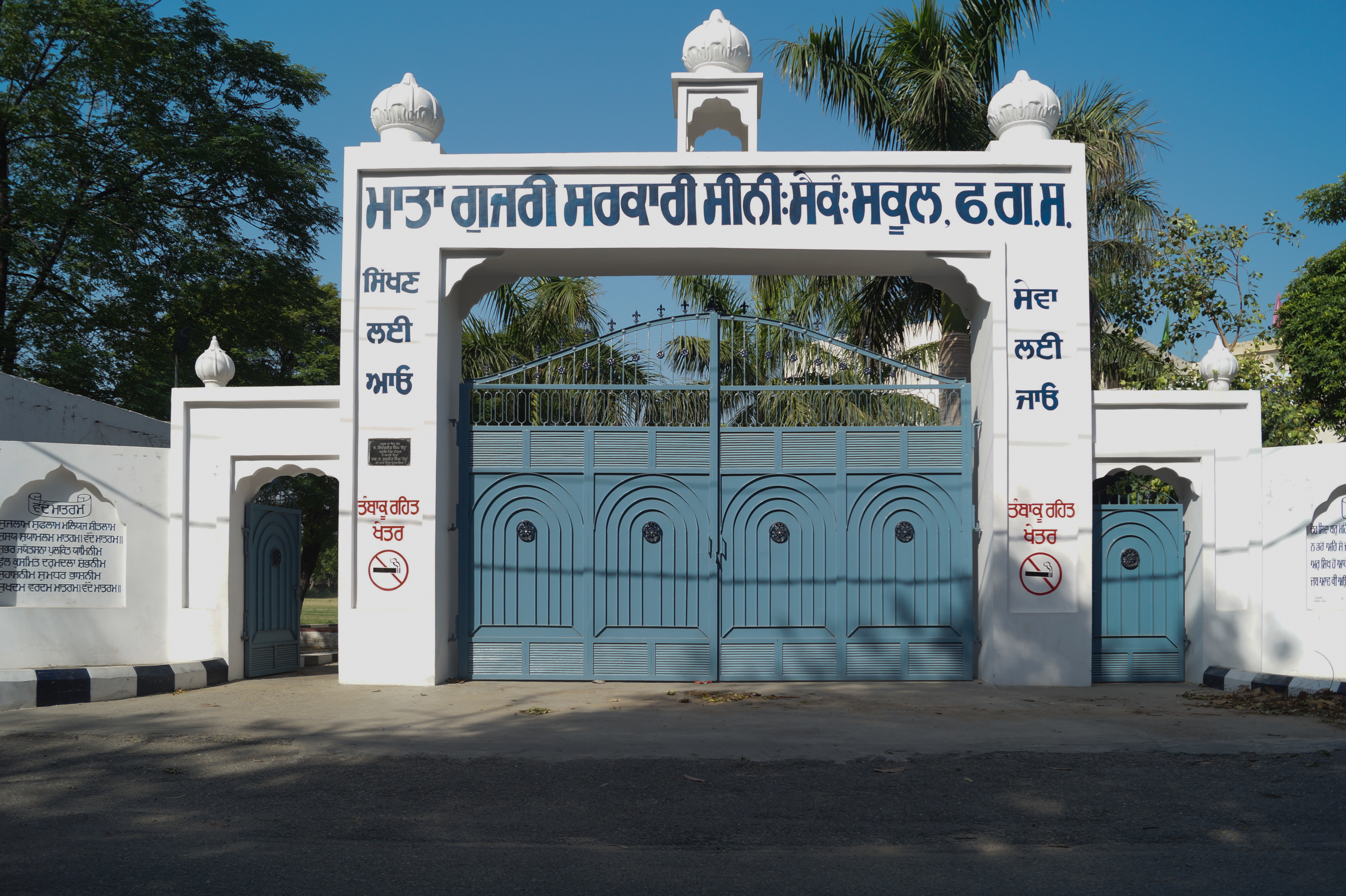

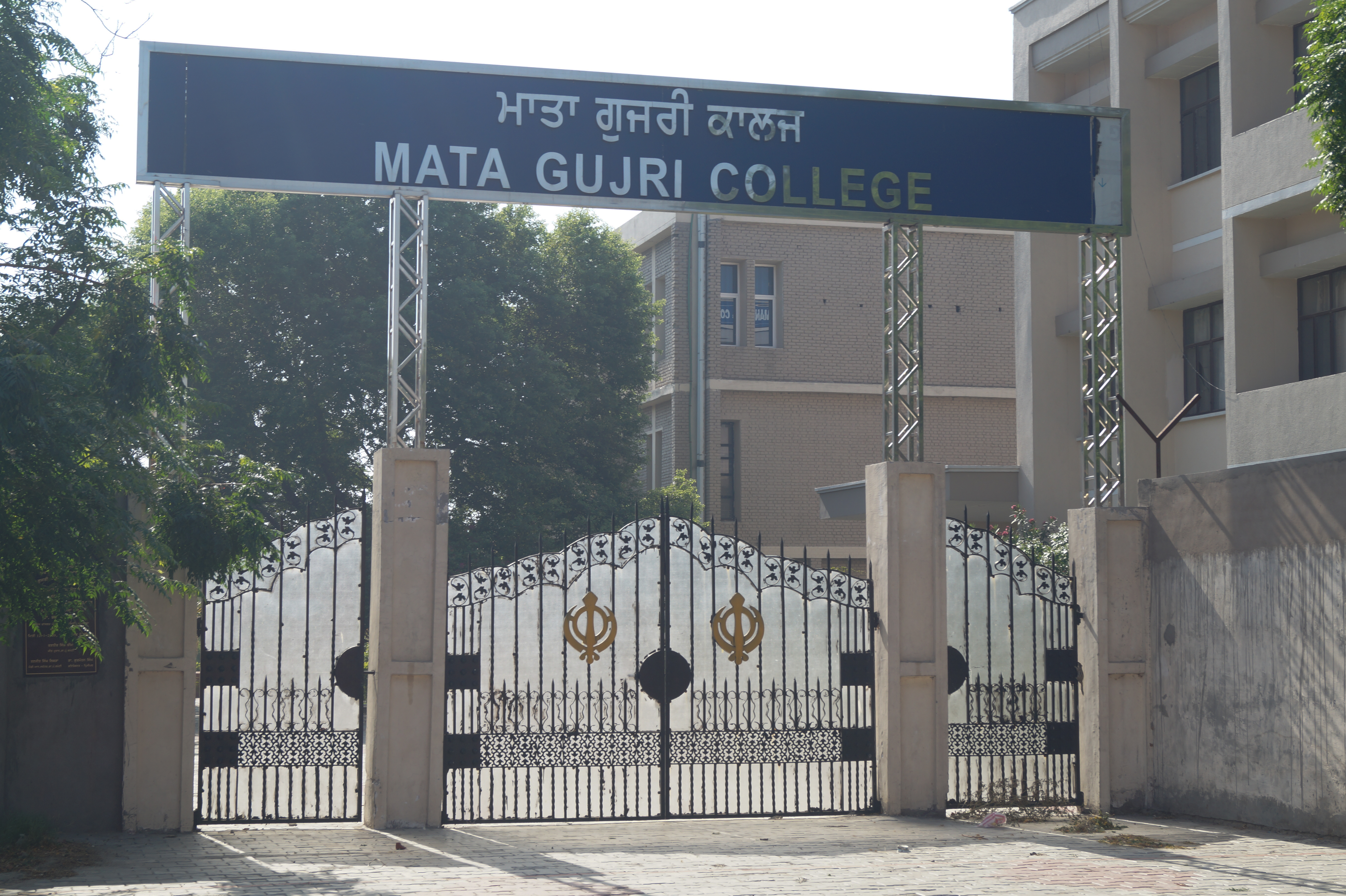

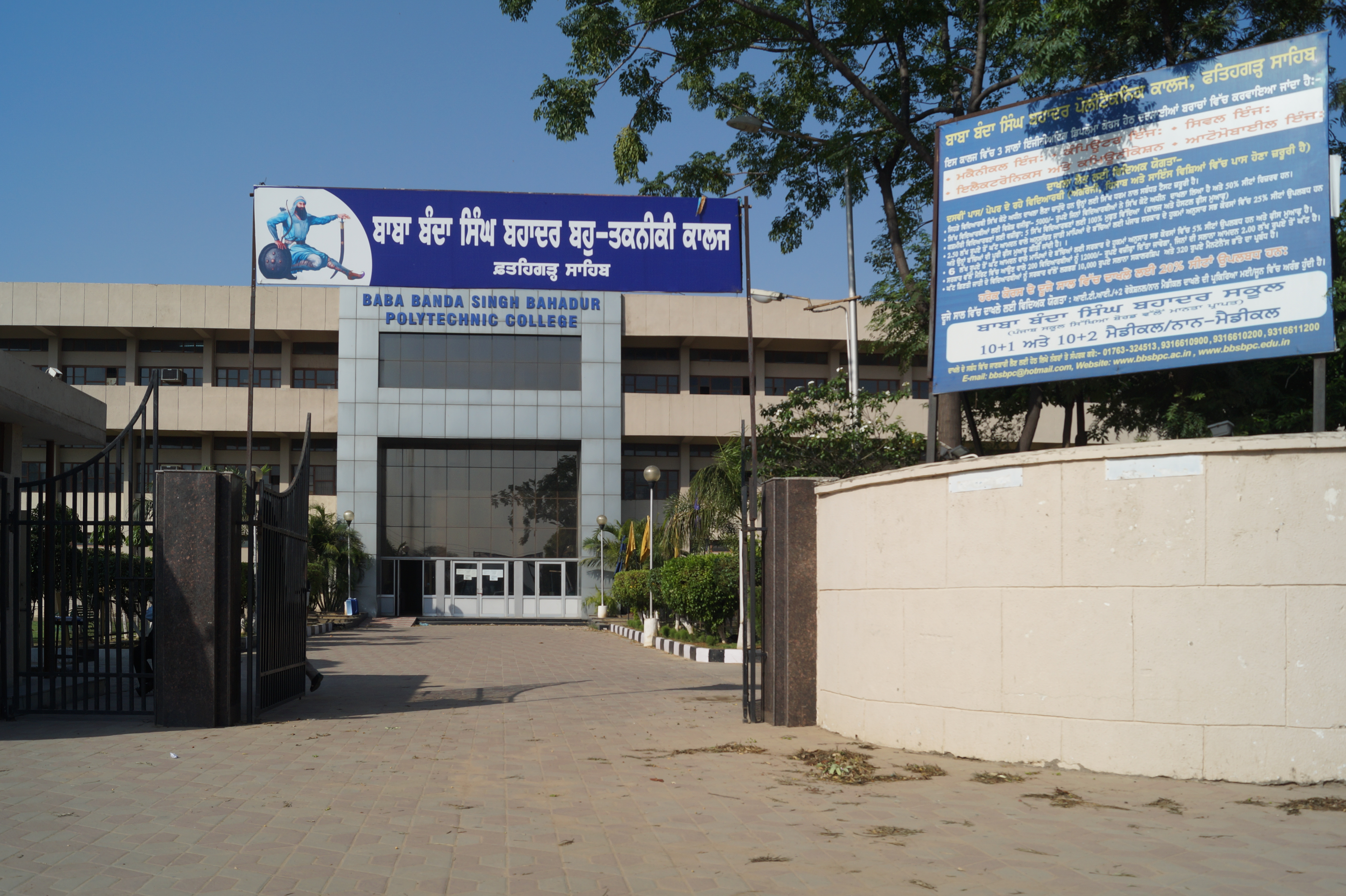

== See also ==
- Reona Bhola
- Bhatt Majra
- Kotla Suleman
