= Reona Bhola =

Reona Bhola Bhola Reona
- village
- Country: India
- State: Punjab
- District: Fatehgarh Sahib

Languages
  - Official: Punjabi
- Time zone: UTC+5:30 (IST)
- PIN: 140406
- Coastline: 0 kilometres (0 mi)
- Nearest city: Sirhind
- Lok Sabha constituency: Sirhind
- Vidhan Sabha constituency: Amloh
- Climate: Slightly cooler area, situated near Bhakhra canal (Köppen)

Reona Bhola is a village near Sirhind in Punjab, India. It is located on the bank of the Bhakhra Canal.

It has an elementary school and its own water supply system.

This village is an example of the unity and diversity of India, as there are a mandir, gurdwara, church and masjid of Peer baba Lalan wala ji (Nigahe wala ji).

The local temperature is slightly cooler than nearby areas because of Bhakhra canal.
