= Rauza Sharif =

Islam building in Punjab, India

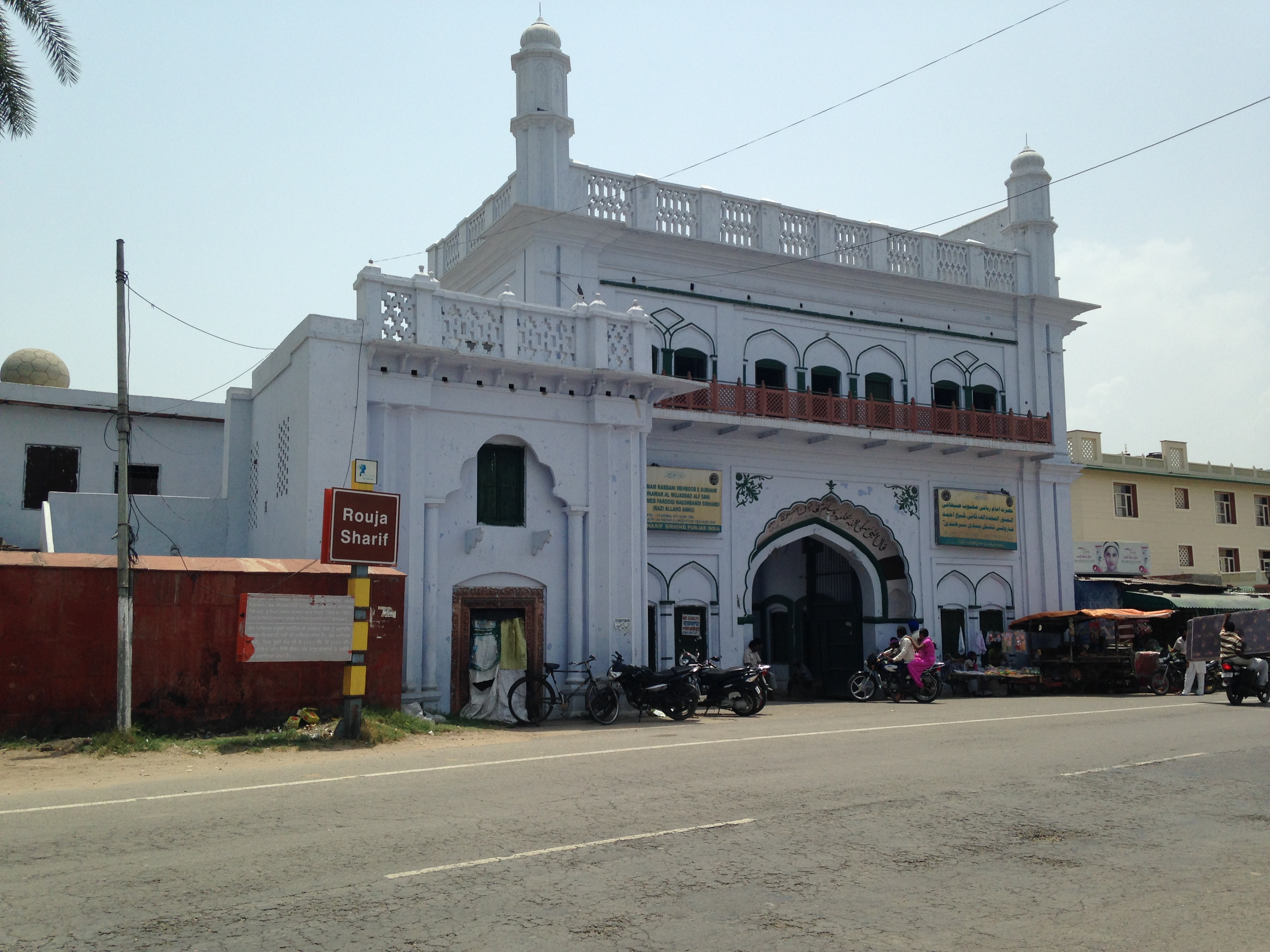
- The entrance to Rouja Sharif.

- Location within Punjab Location within India Location within Asia

Religion
- Affiliation: Islam
- District: Fatehgarh Sahib

Location
- Location: Fatehgarh Sahib
- State: Punjab
- Country: India
- Coordinates: 30.6549916°N 76.391905°E

Architecture
- Style: Mughal architecture

Rauza Sharif is a shrine (Dargah) in the Punjab state of India dedicated to the Sufi teacher Shaikh Ahmad al-Faruqī al-Sirhindī (1564 – 1624). It is located to the north of Gurdwara Fatehgarh Sahib and is where Sirhindi lived during the reigns of Mughal Emperors Akbar and Jahangir.

== Muslim visitation ==
The Urs celebration (death anniversary) of the Mujadid are held here for more than 300 years and are largely attended by Muslims from India, Pakistan, Afghanistan, Indonesia, Bangladesh and other Muslim countries. In 2023, Urs is being celebrated from September 13 to 15.

== Monument compound ==
There are a number of other tombs in the compound mostly of the members of Shaikh Ahmad's house. The mausoleum is a fine building made of bricks partly overlaid with stone and marble. Close to it there is the mausoleum of Rati-ud-Din, an ancestor of the Mujadid. Not far here are the rauzas of Mujaddid’s sons Khawaja Muhammad Sadiq and Khwaja Muhammad Masum. The rauza of latter is some times called rauza chini on account of its excellent mosaic work. In its premises are many other graves of the members of the house of the said reformer and some members of the ruling family of Kabul. There is a grand mosque with a basement and a small tank for performing ablution before the prayers. The shrine has since been taken over by Government of India as a historic monument and regular employees have been kept here for its maintenance, up keep and care.

By the side of the Rauza are the tombs of the Afghan Ruler, Shah Zaman and his Queen.

== Other nearby Tombs ==
Other tombs situated around Sirhind city are:

=== Tomb of Ustad and Shagird ===
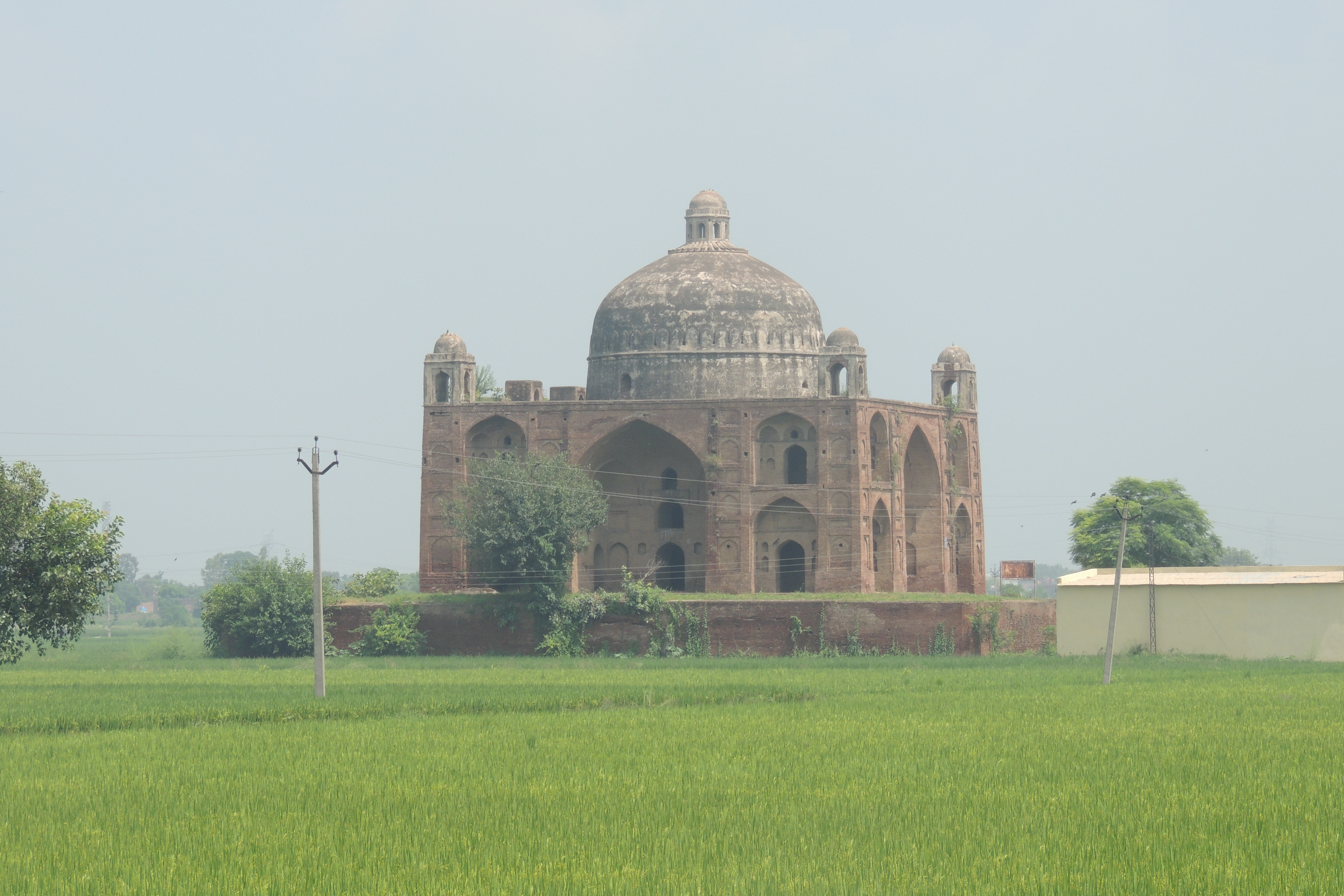
Full View Tomb of Ustad

There are two tombs situated at a distance of about one kilometre west of Rauza Sharif in village Talanian, these are commonly known as the tombs of Ustad Syad Khan (master mason) and Shagird (apprentice mason). It is said that these buildings were constructed by them during their lifetime, some times in the 16th century. The tombs separated from each other by a distance of about 200 metres, are fair examples of contemporary architectural skill, including glazed ornamentation. The design of two are identical but there are few differences in minor details. The building of Ustad’s tomb has been protected under the Punjab Ancient and Historical Monuments and Archaeological Sites and Remains Act, 1964.

=== Tomb of Mir-I-Miran ===
This tomb is situated 5 kilometre north to the Aam Khas Bagh, Sirhind and is connected by a link road. The tomb of Mir-I-Miran is the only important building of stone in Sirhind. It is believed that Mir-I-Miran was a great saint of the place to whom Bahlol Lodhi’s daughter were married. Another important old monument in the vicinity of Mir-I-Miran’s tomb is a tank called Bibi sar, meaning Lady’s Tank. It is said that this tank was constructed by Bahlol’s daughter after the death of her husband. According to another tradition the tank was constructed by Sultan Sikander Lodhi in the name of his sister, wife of Mir-I-Miran. Sultan Bahlol was crowned at Sirhind, he would therefore regard it as a fortunate place for himself and the area was given in Jagir by Sultan Lodhi to a holy man, together with his daughter’s hand. After the Saint's death, the present tomb was built by Bahlol Lodhi and known as tomb of Mir-I-Miran.
