= Moorish Mosque, Kapurthala =

Mosque in Kapurthala, Punjab, India

Moorish Mosque
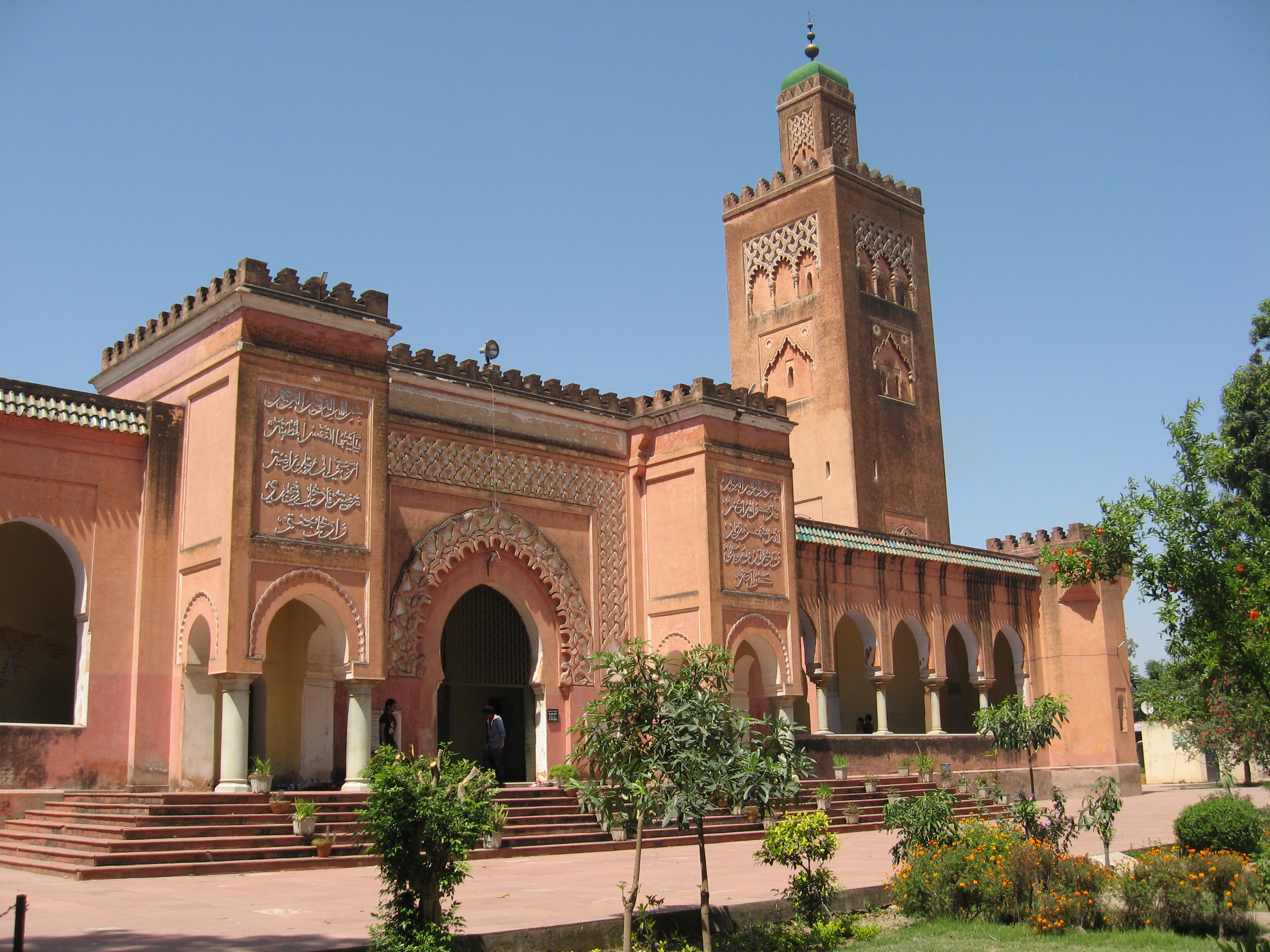
- The mosque, in 2013

- Location of the mosque in Punjab, India

Religion
- Affiliation: Islam
- Ecclesiastical or organisational status: Mosque
- Leadership: Maharajah Jagatjit Singh
- Status: Active

Location
- Location: Kapurthala, Punjab
- Country: India
- Coordinates: 31°22′08″N 75°22′52″E

Architecture
- Architect: Monsieur Maurice Mantout
- Type: Mosque architecture
- Style: Indo-Islamic; Moorish Revival
- Founder: Maharajah Jagatjit Singh
- Groundbreaking: 1927
- Completed: 1930
- Construction cost: Rs 600,000

Specifications
- Minaret: One (square)
- Minaret height: c. 40 m (130 ft)
- Materials: Marble

The Moorish Mosque is a mosque located in Kapurthala in the state of Punjab, India. Commissioned by Maharajah Jagatjit Singh, the last ruler of Kapurthala, the mosque was completed in 1930 in a fusion of Indo-Islamic and Moorish Revival styles, patterned on the lines of the Grand Mosque of Marrakesh, Morocco. At the time of its completion, Kapurthala city was the capital city of the Kapurthala State, known as 'Mini Paris of Punjab' and the mosque was stated to be one of the best in South Asia. The mosque is a monument protected by the Punjab State Department of Archaeology.

== Location ==
The mosque is situated in Kapurthala about 21 kilometres (13 mi) from Jalandhar. Kapurthala is also the nearest rail head to the mosque.

== Background ==
The mosque was built by Maharaja Jagatjit Singh, the last ruler of Kapurthala. He was ruler with extravagant tastes but known for the developmental activities implemented in the then Kapurthala State. He was also known for his secular credentials. The Maharaja, a Sikh, built it, believing in catering to the aspirations of his largely Muslim subjects (about 60%). The mosque was his ambitious effort to promote social integration among his people, and as evident by the fact that when the then Viceroy of India sent him a letter questioning him on the large costs involved in building it, the Maharaja replied: "Your Excellency may be unaware that 60 per cent of my population comprises of my loyal Muslim subjects. It is only in the fitness of things that the best place of worship in my state be constructed for them".

The mosque was built to the architectural design of the French architect Monsieur M. Manteaux, who had also designed the Jagatjit Palace in the city. Construction was started in 1927 and completed in 1930 and built at a cost of Rs 600,000. The mosque was inaugurated by Nawab Sadeq Mohammad Khan V, the Nawab of Bahawalpur. An inscription on the mosque also states that it was built in a period of four years.

== Features ==
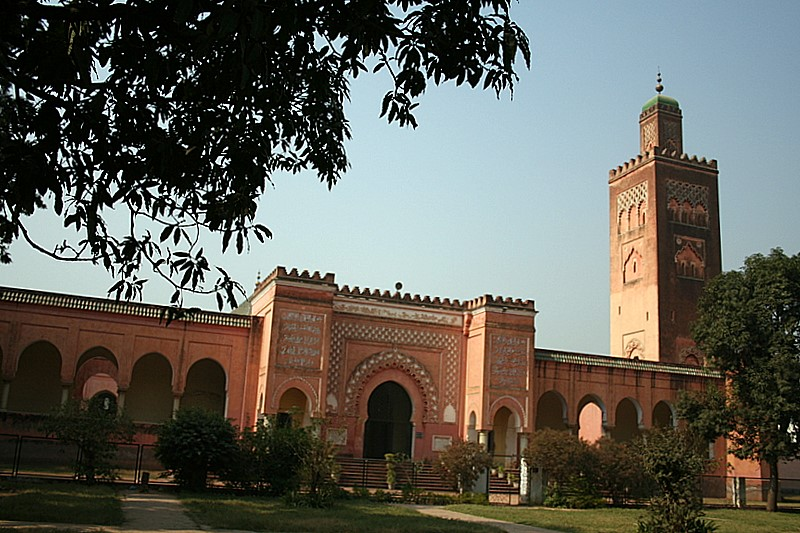
The façade of the mosque

The mosque's architectural design is a replication of the Kutubiyya Mosque in Marrakesh in Morocco. The artwork of the inner dome is attributed to the artists of the Mayo School of Arts, Lahore. Architecturally the mosque is elegant and is built with marble stones. Its uniqueness lies in the fact that unlike most other mosques in India, there are no external domes. There is a c.40-metre-tall (130 ft) square tower, or minaret, located at one end of the edifice. The mosque's inner courtyard is paved entirely with marble, and has a unique design.

Glass panes have been fitted in the arched sections of the doors, windows and other artistic feature. Wooden grills are provided in the interior while latticed iron work form the external features. The mosque is painted in light red colour. However, the doors and windows and eves are painted in green colour. Inside the mosque, the wooden ceiling is varnished in black and red colours.

A model of the mosque was designed by Monsier Mantout and was exquisitely crafted in wood. This was presented to Mantout by the Maharaja on 14 March 1930.

=== Restoration ===
In 1972, as part of the operation "city beautification" programme initiated by the state government at the suggestion of then Prime Minister of India, Indira Gandhi, the mosque was cleaned up and a rose garden laid in its front lawn. Further conservation work was completed in advance of a visit to the mosque by A. P. J. Abdul Kalam, the President of India, in late 2013. The Archaeological Survey of India assessed the state of the mosque and, in November 2013, released a detailed project report that identified the required scope of restoration work. Restoration and conservation work was completed between 2013 and 2017, funded by the Punjab Government Department of Cultural Affairs, Archaeology & Museums.

== Gallery ==
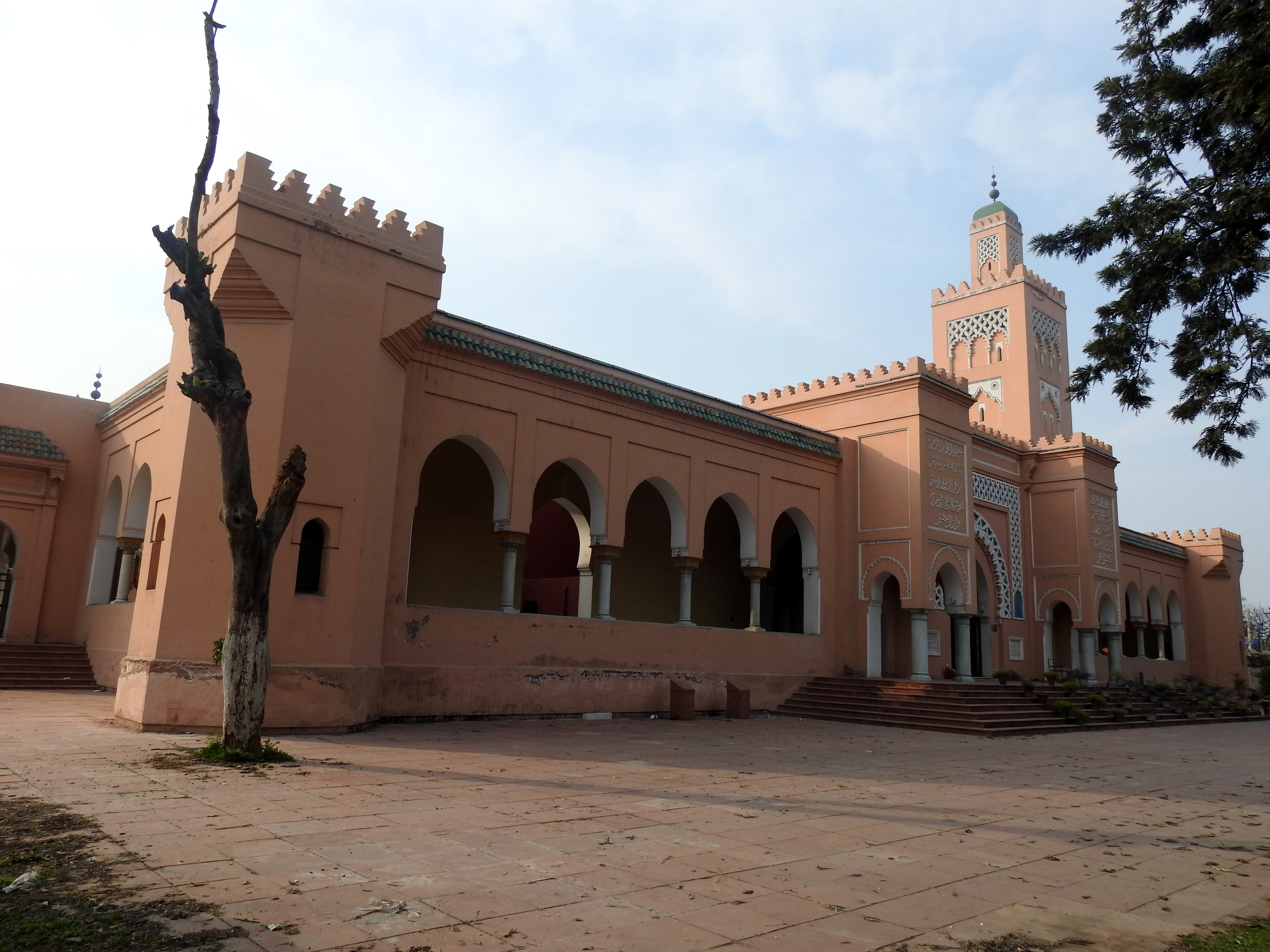

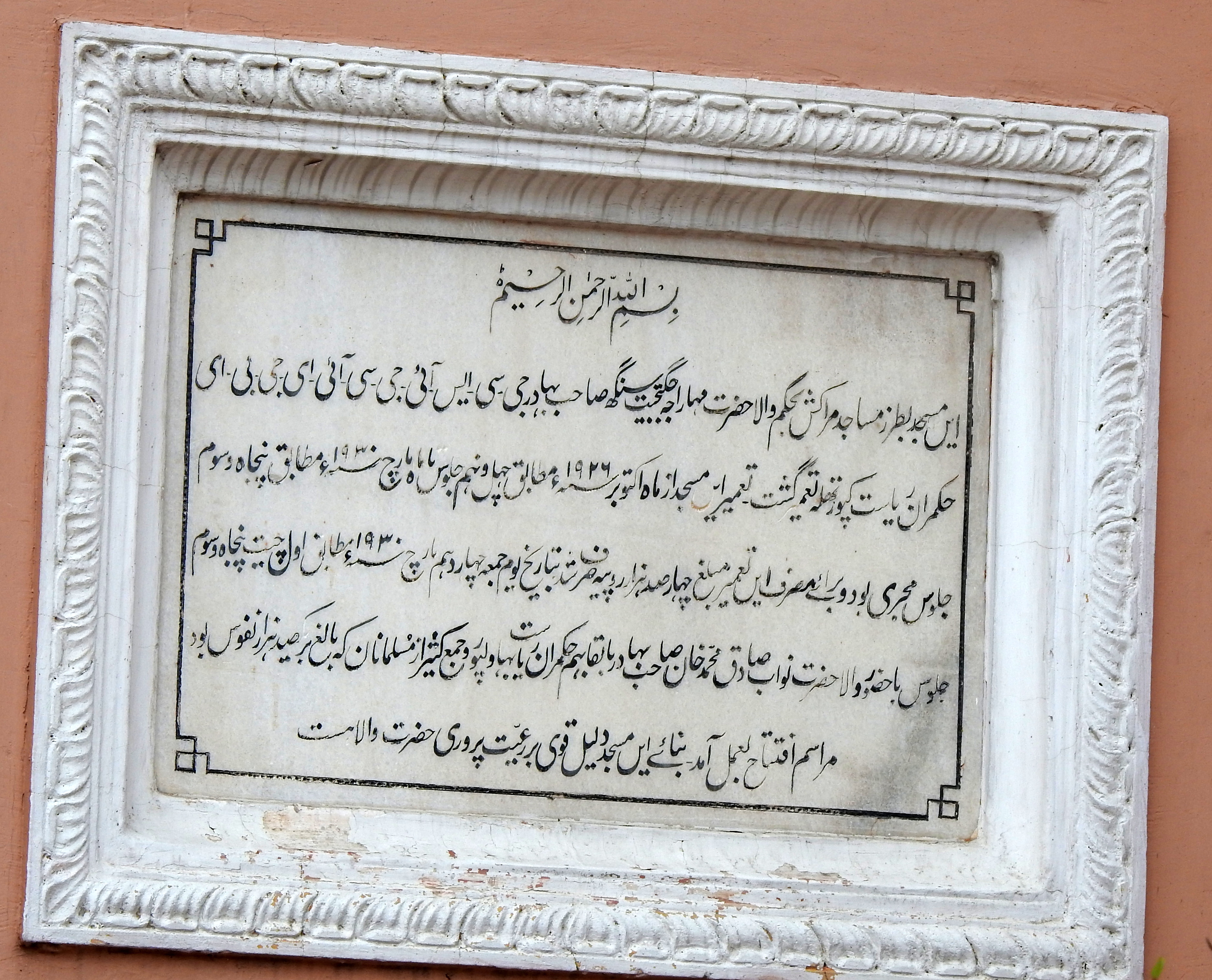
Inscriptions

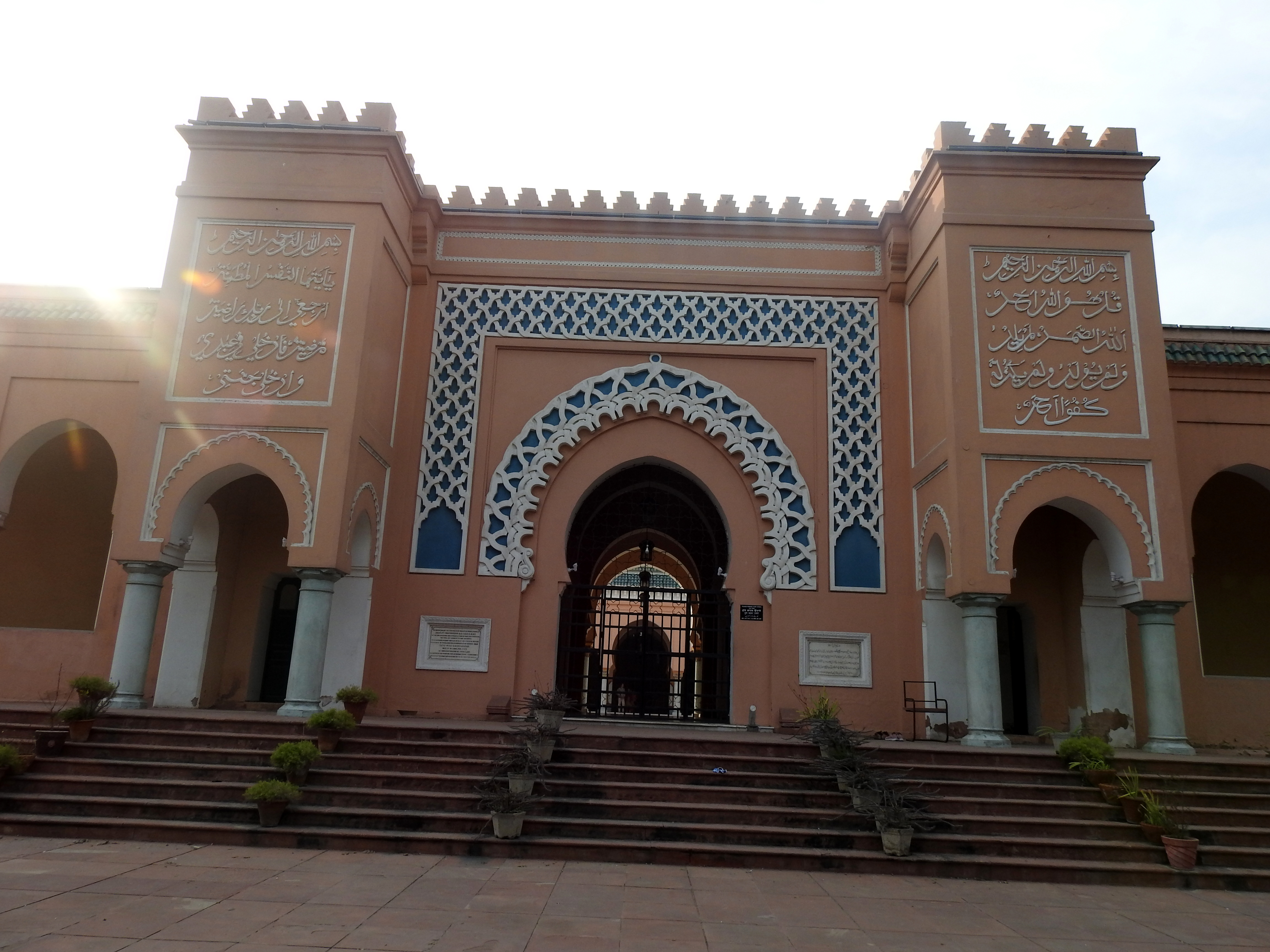

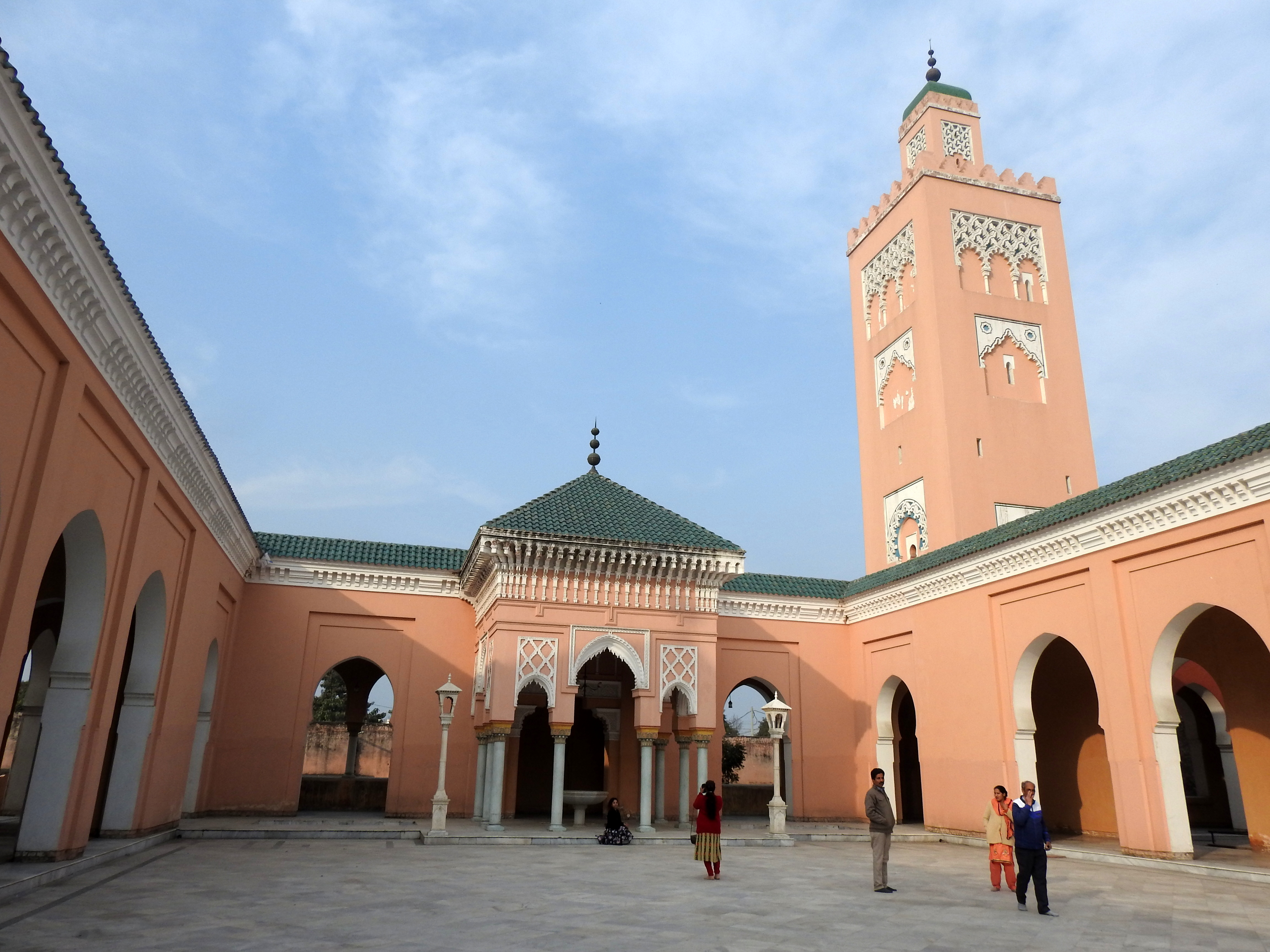
Courtyard with square minaret

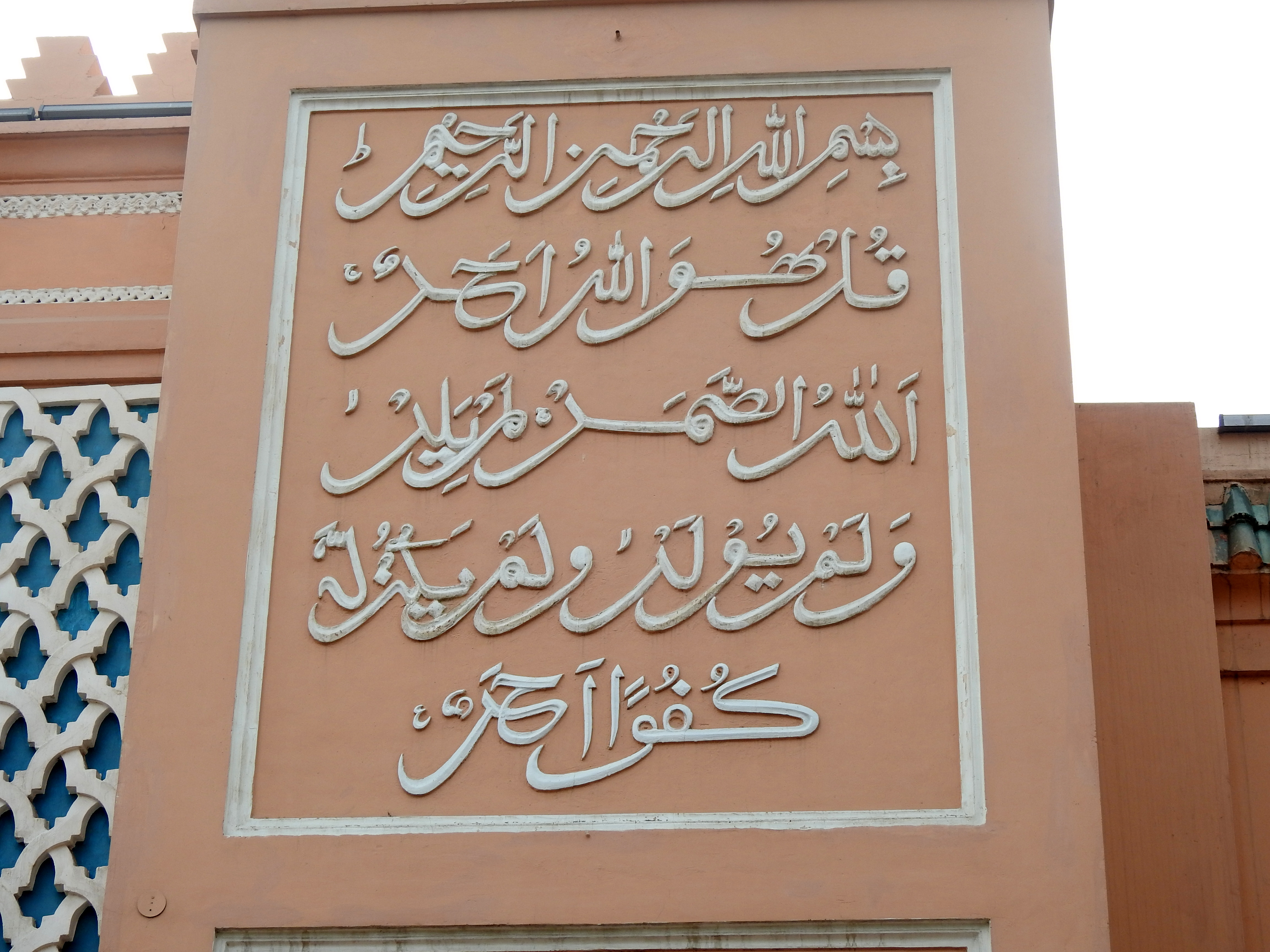
Inscriptions

== See also ==
- Islam in India
- List of mosques in India
- List of State Protected Monuments in Punjab, India
