= Bhatt Majra, Fatehgarh Sahib =

Coordinates: 30.593°N 76.416°E

Bhatt Majra
- Village
- Interactive map of Bhatt Majra
- Country: India
- State: Punjab
- District: Fatehgarh Sahib

Population (Unknown)
  - Total: 745

Bhatt Majra is a village in Sirhind mandal, district Fatehgarh Sahib, state Punjab, India. The village is on the world map for organic farming, visited by Prince Charles in 2005. Bhatt Majra has a population of 745 or more people and has a literacy rate of around 76%.

It is 41 km from its state's main city, Chandigarh.
