= Baba Banda Singh Bahadur Polytechnic College =

College in Punjab, India

Baba Banda Singh Bahadur Polytechnic Fatehgarh Sahib
- Type: Public
- Established: 2006
- Principal: H.S.Bhatti
- Location: Fatehgarh Sahib, Punjab, India; 30.6494°N 76.3969°E
- Campus: Urban
- Website: www.bbsbpc.ac.in

Baba Banda Singh Bahadur Polytechnic College (BBSBPC), Fatehgarh Sahib, Punjab, India was established in 2006 by the Baba Banda Singh Bahadur Educational Trust formed under the patronage of Shiromani Gurdwara Parbandhak Committee with the approval of the Government of Punjab.

The college is approved by AICTE New Delhi, Government of India and is affiliated to the Punjab State Board Of Technical Education and Industrial Training, Chandigarh.

== Three year diplomas ==
- Computer Science and Engineering
- Electronics and Communications Engineering
- Mechanical Engineering
- Civil Engineering
- Automobile Engineering

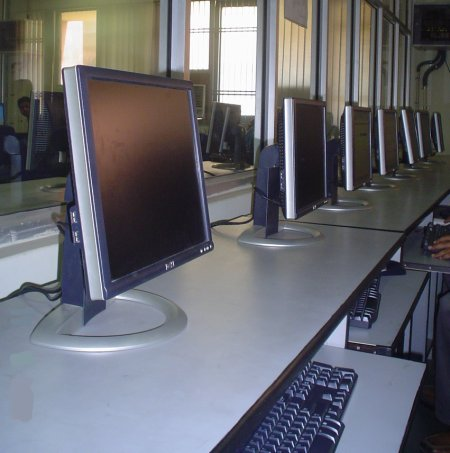
Computers in a lab at BBSBPC

== Location ==
The college is campus of 175 acres (0.71 km^{2}) in the surroundings of historic Gurdwaras of Fatehgarh Sahib. The college is named after Baba Banda Singh Bahadur a saint and warrior; who conquered the Sirhind fort and laid to rest the tyranny of Mughal Empire.
