= Bhatt Majra, Patiala =

Bhat Majra
- Location in Punjab, India
- Coordinates: 30.351°N 76.543°E
- District: Patiala district
- State: Punjab
- Country: India

Population (2011)
  - Total: 1,547

Language
  - Official: Punjabi
- Time zone: UTC+5:30 (IST)

Bhatt Majra is a village in the Patiala district of Punjab state of India.

== See also ==
- Punjab, India
