= List of Monuments of National Importance in Punjab, India =

This is a list of Monuments of National Importance (ASI) as officially recognized by and available through the website of the Archaeological Survey of India in the Indian state Punjab. The monument identifier is a combination of the abbreviation of the subdivision of the list (state, ASI circle) and the numbering as published on the website of the ASI. Thirty-three Monuments of National Importance have been recognized by the ASI in Punjab.

== List of monuments ==
SL. No.	Description	Location	Address	District	Coordinates	Image
N-PB-1	Sarai Amanat Khan Gateway on the old Delhi and Lahore Road	Amanat Khan		Tarn Taran Sahib	31°30′37″N 74°41′32″E	Sarai Amanat Khan Gateway on the old Delhi and Lahore Road More images
N-PB-2	Gateway of the old Sarai Akbar or Jahangir on the old Delhi and Lahore Road	Fatehbad		Tarn Taran Sahib	31°22′47″N 75°06′05″E	Upload Photo
N-PB-3	Ram Bagh Gate	Amritsar		Amritsar	31°37′50″N 74°52′41″E	Ram Bagh Gate More images
N-PB-4	Gobindgarh Fort	Bhatinda		Bhatinda	30°12′30″N 74°56′19″E	Gobindgarh Fort More images
N-PB-5	Mound known as Mud Fort	Abohar		Fazilka	30°09′19″N 74°12′07″E	Upload Photo
N-PB-6	Baradari (generally known as Anarkali)	Batala		Gurdaspur	31°48′51″N 75°12′45″E	Baradari (generally known as Anarkali) More images
N-PB-7	Shamsher Khan's tomb	Batala		Gurdaspur	31°48′44″N 75°12′48″E	Shamsher Khan's tomb More images
N-PB-8	Takht-e-Akbari	Kalanaur		Gurdaspur	32°01′05″N 75°09′53″E	Takht-e-Akbari More images
N-PB-9	Mughal Kos Minar	Cheema Kalan		Jalandhar	31°05′16″N 75°36′24″E	Mughal Kos Minar
N-PB-10	Mughal Bridge	Dakhni		Jalandhar	31°10′18″N 75°24′59″E	Upload Photo
N-PB-11	Mughal Kos Minar	Dakhni		Jalandhar		Mughal Kos Minar
N-PB-12	Sarai including gateways	Dakhni		Jalandhar	31°10′19″N 75°24′41″E	Sarai including gateways More images
N-PB-13	Mughal Kos Minar	Jahangir		Jalandhar	31°10′26″N 75°24′26″E	Mughal Kos Minar
N-PB-14	Theh Gatti (Mound)	Nagar		Jalandhar	31°02′27″N 75°50′12″E	Upload Photo
N-PB-15	Mughal Kos Minar	Nakodar		Jalandhar		Upload Photo
N-PB-16	Tombs of Mohd. Momin and Hazi Jamal	Nakodar		Jalandhar	31°07′42″N 75°28′29″E	Tombs of Mohd. Momin and Hazi Jamal More images
N-PB-17	Sarai including gateway	Nurmahal		Jalandhar	31°05′33″N 75°35′37″E	Sarai including gateway More images
N-PB-18	Mughal Kos Minar	Shampur		Jalandhar		Mughal Kos Minar
N-PB-19	Mughal Kos Minar	Tut Kalan		Jalandhar	31°08′58″N 75°26′39″E	Mughal Kos Minar
N-PB-20	Mughal Kos Minar	Upplan (Uppal)		Jalandhar	31°05′57″N 75°33′50″E	Mughal Kos Minar
N-PB-21	Mughal Kos Minar	Veerpind		Jalandhar	31°06′51″N 75°31′16″E	Mughal Kos Minar
N-PB-22	Kos Minar	Ghungrali Rajputan		Ludhiana	30°43′58″N 76°07′10″E	Kos Minar
N-PB-23	Kos Minar	Lashkri Khan		Ludhiana	30°45′26″N 76°05′07″E	Upload Photo
N-PB-24	Kos Minar	Dhandari Kalan Ludhiana		Ludhiana		Upload Photo
N-PB-25	Kos Minar	Sherpur		Ludhiana	30°54′22″N 75°52′52″E	Upload Photo
N-PB-26	Ancient Site	Sunet		Ludhiana	30°53′01″N 75°48′22″E	Upload Photo
N-PB-27	Kos Minar	Sanehwal		Ludhiana	30°50′09″N 75°59′09″E	Upload Photo
N-PB-28	Ancient site near college compound	Rupnagar		Rupnagar	30°58′17″N 76°31′25″E	Ancient site near college compound
N-PB-29	Ancient Buddhist Stupa and site, Sanghol	Fatehgarh Sahib		Fatehgarh Sahib	30°47′20″N 76°23′29″E	Ancient Buddhist Stupa and site, Sanghol More images
N-PB-30	Summer Palace of Maharaja Ranjit Singh, Amritsar, Punjab, India		Ram Bagh, Amritsar	Amritsar	31°38′16″N 74°52′44″E	Summer Palace of Maharaja Ranjit Singh, Amritsar, Punjab, India More images
N-PB-31	Phillaur Fort	Phillaur		Jalandhar	31°00′43″N 75°47′20″E	Phillaur Fort More images
N-PB-32	Ancient Mound	Katpalon		Jalandhar	31°01′53″N 75°50′58″E	Ancient Mound
N-PB-33	Ancient Site, Buddhist Stupa (SGL 11)	Sanghol		Fatehgarh Sahib	30°47′33″N 76°23′42″E	Ancient Site, Buddhist Stupa (SGL 11) More images

== See also ==
- List of Monuments of National Importance in India for other Monuments of National Importance in India
- List of State Protected Monuments in Punjab
