= Ailum =

- Town
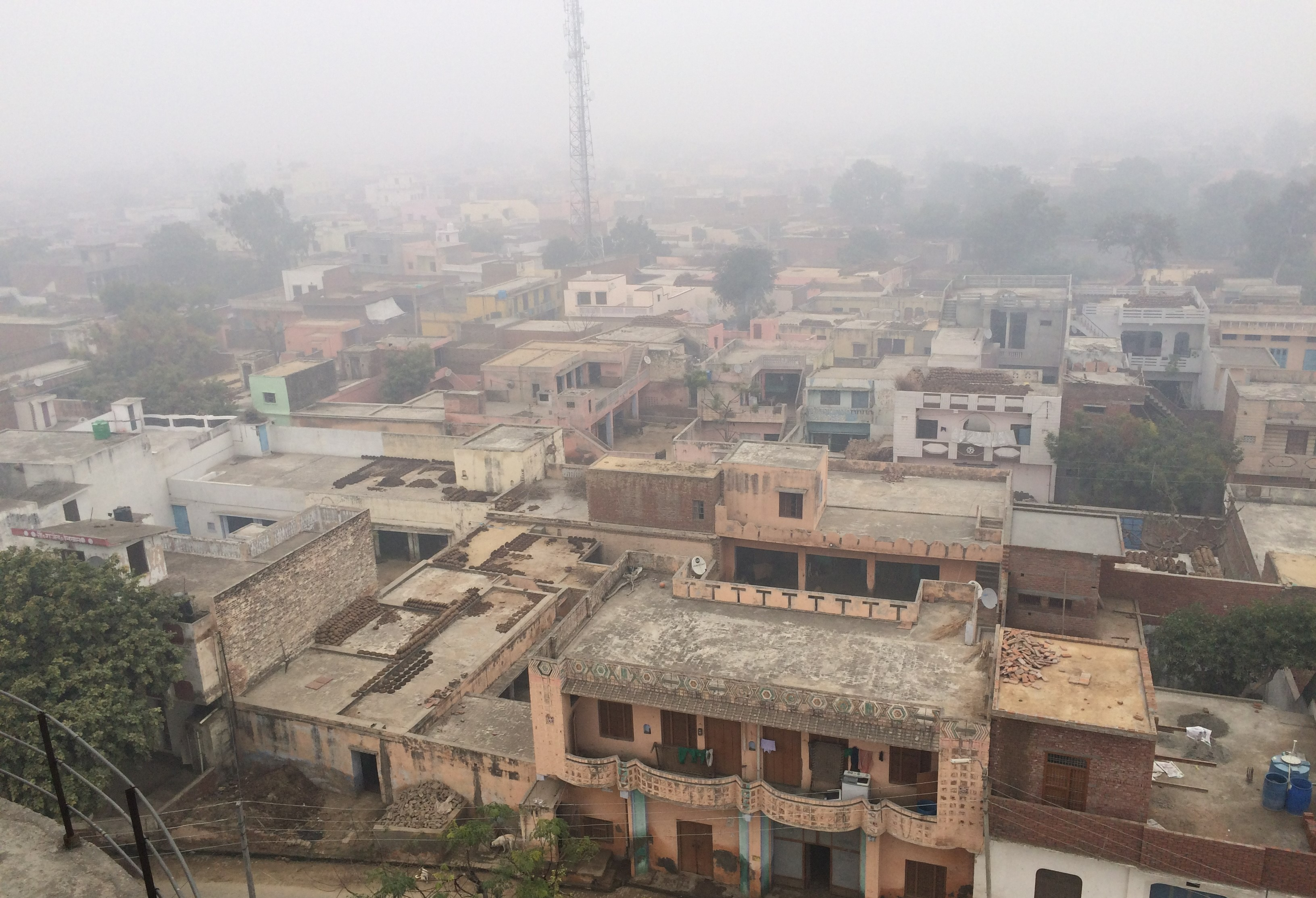

- Location in Uttar Pradesh, India Ailum (India)
- Coordinates: 29°16′26″N 77°17′33″E
- Country: India
- State: Uttar Pradesh
- District: Shamli

Government
  - Type: Nagar Panchayat
  - Body: Ailum Nagar Panchayat
  - Chairman: Reena Panwar
- Elevation: 236.867 m (777.12 ft)

Population (2001)
  - Total: 13,052

Languages
  - Official: Hindi and Khadiboli
- Time zone: UTC+5:30 (IST)
- PIN: 247771
- Telephone Code: +91-1392
- Vehicle registration: UP 19

Ailum, is Nagar panchayat town in Shamli district in the Indian state of Uttar Pradesh, situated in the upper doab region of River Ganga and Yamuna. It is located at a distance of 75 km from National Capital New Delhi and a part of the National Capital Region (NCR) of India.

== Geography ==
Ailum is located at 29.17°N 77.17°E at an average elevation of 236.867 meters from sea level. The Postal Code (Zip Code) is 247771. Ailum is base town for surrounding villages Kaniyan, Bharsi, Asara, Nala, Bhanera etc. for marketing, social and transport services to travel to major cities of the country.

== Demographics ==
At the2001 census of India, Ailum had a population of 13,052. By the 2011 Census of India, the population had declined to 12,110 people across 2199 households. Males constitute 54% of the population and females 46%, and there is an average literacy rate of 67%. Ailum literacy rate is steadily increasing because better primary services and increasing transport facilities in this area. Many students from this town have been clearing engineering, medical and defence services examination and serving premium research institute of the country at various capacities. Majority youth from this town are serving the nation through state police, paramilitary forces and armed forces of India. Ailum town, back home, is mostly populated by farmers, mostly Hindu Jat and agriculture being the main occupation. Mostly town and surrounding village born children, by surname are Panwar, a Jat clan found in Northern India.

== Transport ==
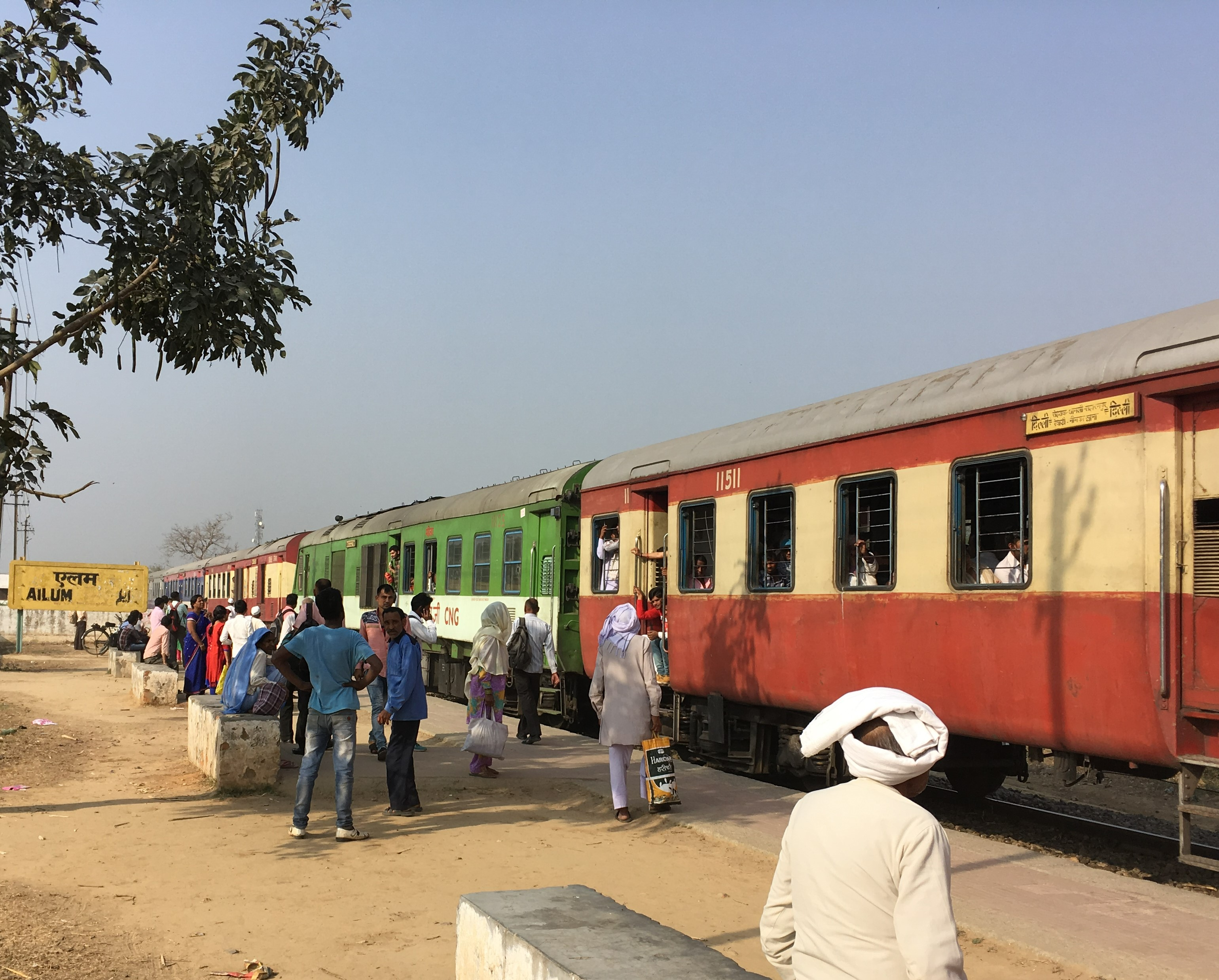
Ordinary day at Railway Station

Ailum is situated midway on the National Highway 709B connecting Delhi to Saharanpur via Baghpat Baraut Shamli [DELHI – Baghpat – Baraut – Ailum – Kandhla – Shamli – Thana Bhawan – Jalalabad – Nanauta – SAHARANPUR ]. The above route is also accessible and connected by Broad Gauge Train Link ( Delhi Junction-Shamli-Saharanpur). There are multiple unreserved and express trains run between Delhi and Shamli and these trains are mostly used for daily commutation to/from Delhi. Ailum have regular bus service to nearby cities Baraut, Shamli, New Delhi, Gaziabad and Sahranpur.

The major Important Towns and Cities in the neighbourhood are

- Delhi 78 km on the South
- Saharanpur 90 km on the North,
- Muzaffar Nagar 52 km on the East
- Meerut 60 km on the South East
- Panipat 62 km on the west

The nearest major airport, Indira Gandhi International Airport at Delhi is about 100 km away from Ailum railway station/ Bus stand.

== Social life ==
Most townsfolk, Hindu Jats, are agriculturist by profession, mostly hereditary, others retired army men, educationist and from other services. Cash crop sugarcane being the main constituent crop of the place, sugarcane is sold at nearby "The Kisan Sahkari Chini Mills Ltd RAMALA" ( Sugar plant of installed capacity of 5000 TCD) and privately owned jaggery / Jaggery powder producing small scale industries. Mostly farmers are shareholder of this sugar mill, running under aegis of Uttar Pradesh Sugar Cooperative factories federation limited, Lucknow since 1978–79.

The place has good market roads(gali) for primary daily requirement and services. The place is having few good community halls for local functions and rituals. Primary Health Center, privately owned medical clinics and medical stores provide basic health services to citizens. Citizens visit major cities Meerut, Delhi etc. for specialty medical services.

== Education ==
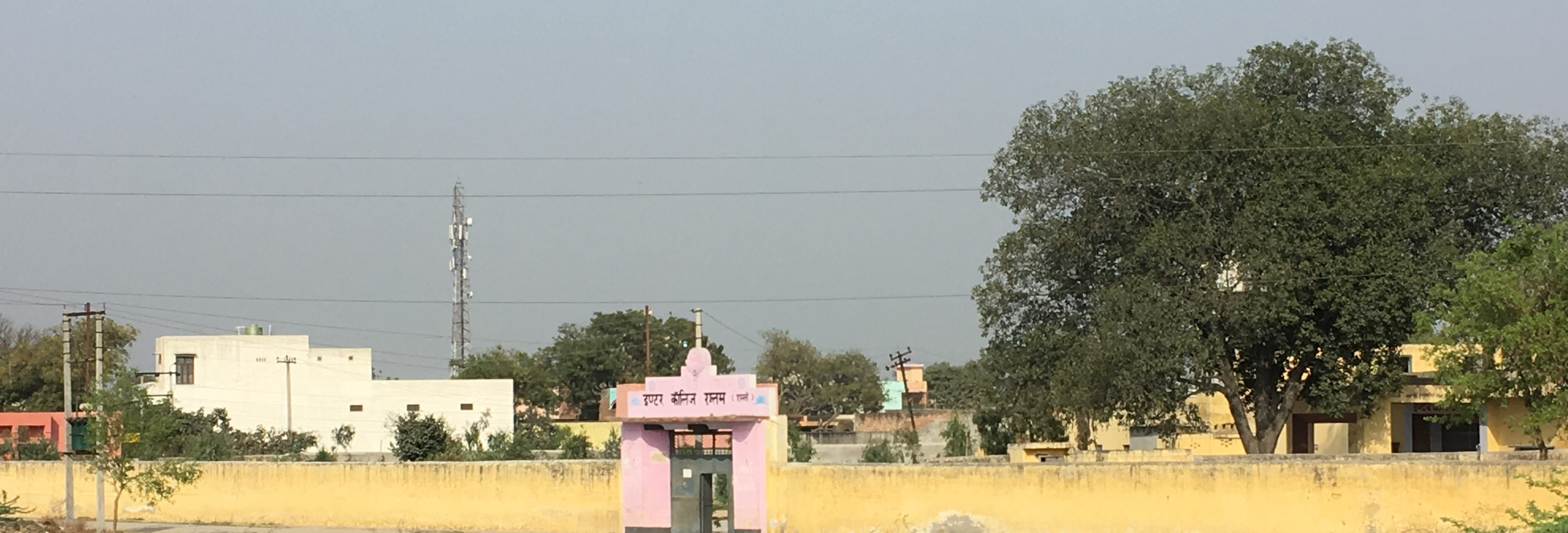
Inter College Ailum

There are primary schools in the town. There is one High School and Inter college providing education to students of this town and surrounding villages. It has facilities including computer labs, a sports center and a laboratory for students. Students go to nearby cities for graduate and post-graduate studies.

== Religion ==
Most people in the town are followers of Sanatan Dharam (Hinduism), followed by Muslims and Jains. Ancient Shiv temple, Shiv-Durga Mandir in main Bazar are some of important worshiping places of the town. A ritual of visiting respective agriculture fields to worship BABA (a symbolic name given to agriculture fields) on the day Diwali, is being followed since ages. Migrated families also visit the town to participate in religious ritual event for well-being of all family members.

== Politics and Government ==
Ailum is a part of Kairana Assembly constituency, one of the 403 constituencies of the Uttar Pradesh Legislative Assembly and part of Kairana Lok Sabha constituency, one of the 80 Lok Sabha (parliamentary) constituencies in the Indian state of Uttar Pradesh. Bharatiya Janata Party and Rashtriya Lok Dal have good numbers of supporters in this region.

Ailum village was established as Nagar Panchayat on 25 Nov. 1989 and Shri Ramkishan Panwar was elected as the first chairman in year 1995 after governing Nagar Panchayat through administrator for approx. six years. Ailum Nagar panchayat is divided into 12 wards and election of ward member and chairman are conducted every five years. Nagar Panchayat office, located on Bhanera road, provides basic administrative services to citizens.

Ailum Nagar Panchayat Ward
S.No.	District	Post	Nagar Panchayat	Ward Name
1	Shamli	Chairman	Ailum	---
2	Shamli	Member	Ailum	Prem Nagar
3	Shamli	Member	Ailum	Azad Nagar (W)
4	Shamli	Member	Ailum	Vikas Nagar (S)
5	Shamli	Member	Ailum	Ravidaspuri, Azad Nagar(E)
6	Shamli	Member	Ailum	Brihampuri, Ravidaspuri Aa
7	Shamli	Member	Ailum	Subhas Nagar (S)
8	Shamli	Member	Ailum	Jawahar Nagar
9	Shamli	Member	Ailum	Shastri Nagar
10	Shamli	Member	Ailum	Gandhi Nagar
11	Shamli	Member	Ailum	Vikas Nagar (N)
12	Shamli	Member	Ailum	Subhas Nagar (N)
13	Shamli	Member	Ailum	Hari Nagar

Ailum Nagar Panchayat has a committee consisting of a chairman along with 12 elected ward members, which looks after essential services and facilities for the citizen. The committee works towards maintaining and improving citizen services:

- Maintaining records of births and deaths in town
- Sanitation program
- Street lighting and providing and maintaining roads in wards and main roads of town
- Schools : Primary and secondary
- Program for adult literacy and creating and running libraries
- Water supply to every ward of urban area
- Drainage system to clear the solid and liquid wastes from town

Chairman, Ailum Nagar Panchayat
S.No.	Name	From	To
1	Shri Ramkishan Panwar	01-12-1995	30-11-2000
2	Shri Rajbeer Singh	03-12-2000	25-02-2005
3	Shri Satendera Singh*	09-03-2005	22-08-2005
4	Shrimati Rajdulari	16-11-2006	17-11-2011
5	Shri Udaiveer Singh	19-09-2012	26-07-2017
6	Dr. Deepa Panwar	12-12-2017	01-01-2023
7	Shrimati Reena Panwar	27-05-2023	Incumbent

*Caretaker Chairman

There has been some instances where Nagar Panchayat was governed through administrator because of unavailability of elected representatives.

== Law Enforcement ==
The town has its own police check post at Ailum bus stand, which comes under the jurisdiction ofKandhla Police Station and district headquarter at Shamli.

== Climate ==
Ailum has a monsoon influenced humid subtropical climate characterized by hot summers and cooler winters. Summers last from April to July and are extremely hot with temperatures reaching 45-47 °C. The Loo (hot, dusty wind) from the west also flows during summer dry month of May and June. It may lead to sunstrokes due to high temperature. Black storm ( Kali Andhi) is also observed in the region, before arrival of monsoon.

The monsoon arrives in late July and continues till the middle of September and temperatures drop slightly. Rainfall is about 800-900 millimeters per annum, which is suitable for growing crops in this region. Temperatures rise again in October and then town then has a mild, dry winter season from November to the middle of March, with temperature falling to 2-3 °C. The town receives no snowfall.

== Notable Personalities ==
- Justice Mahavir Singh, judge and social reformer
- Shri Samsher Bahadur Singh, National Poet

== See also ==
1. Panwar
2. Shamli District
3. National Capital Region
4. Uttar Pradesh
