= Shamsher Singh =

Shamsher Singh may refer to:

- Shamsher Singh (cricketer, born 1972), Indian cricketer
- Shamsher Singh (cricketer, born 1983), Indian cricketer
- Shamsher Singh (field hockey) (born 1997), Indian field hockey player
- Shamsher Bahadur Singh (1913–1993), Indian poet and writer
- Shamsher Singh "Shera", fictional gangster in the 1984 Indian film Andar Baahar, played by Danny Denzongpa
- Shamsher Singh, a villain in the 1995 Indian film Karan Arjun played by Jack Gaud

== See also ==
- Shamshir (disambiguation)
- Singh, an Indian surname
- Shamsher Singh Dullo, Indian politician
- Shamsher Singh Gogi, Indian politician
- Shamsher Singh Jolly (1922–1972), Indian philanthropist
- Shamsher Singh Sheri, Indian politician
- Shamsher Singh Surjewala (1932–2020), Indian lawyer and politician
