= Shamshir (disambiguation) =

The Shamshir, also Shamsher and Shamsheer, is a type of sword

Shamshir or Shamsher may also refer to:

== Weapon systems ==
- PNS Shamsheer, the name of three ships of the Pakistan Navy
- IRIS Shamshir, a ship of the Iranian Navy
- Shamsher, the name given to the SEPECAT Jaguar in Indian Air Force service

== People ==
- Shamsher Gazi (1712–1760), Bengali ruler of Roshnabad and Tripura
- Shamsher Bahadur I, ruler of the Indian princely state of Banda
- Bir Shamsher Jang Bahadur (1852–1901), the third Prime Minister of Nepal from the Rana Dynasty
- Chandra Shamsher Jang Bahadur Rana (1863–1929), the fifth Prime Minister of Nepal from the Rana dynasty
- Dev Shamsher Jang Bahadur Rana (born 1862), Prime Minister of Nepal
- Mohan Shamsher Jang Bahadur Rana (1885–1967), the prime minister and foreign minister of Nepal
- Baber Shamsher Jang Bahadur Rana (1888–1960), the last Minister of Defense of Nepal from the Rana dynasty
- Kaiser Shamsher Jang Bahadur Rana (1892–1964), field marshal in the Royal Nepalese Army
- Shamsher Bahadur Singh (1911–1993), Indian poet
- Subarna Shamsher Rana (1910–1977), leading figure in the movement to overthrow the ruling Rana autocracy and to establish democracy in Nepal
- Kiran Shamsher Rana (1916–1983), Nepalese army officer
- Shamsher Singh (disambiguation)
  - Shamsher Singh Sheri (1942–2005), communist leader in India
- Shamsher Khan (1933–2017), Indian Olympic swimmer
- Moosa Bin Shamsher (born 1945), Bangladeshi business magnate
- Shamsher M. Chowdhury Bir Bikrom, former Foreign Secretary of Bangladesh
- Shamsheer Singh Manhas (born 1960), Indian Member of Parliament
- Muhammad Shamsher Ali, Bangladeshi academic and vice-chancellor
- Shamsheer Vayalil (born 1977), Indian physician, entrepreneur and philanthropist
- Shamsher Bahadur (politician), Indian politician

== Places and settlements ==
- Shamshir, Iran, a village in Kermanshah Province, Iran
- Shamshir Rural District, an administrative subdivision in Kermanshah Province, Iran
- Shamsher Nagar, Moulvibazar, Bangladesh
- Shamshernagar, India, a village in Bihar, India
- Tomb of Shamsher Khan (disambiguation), various tombs in India including one in Shamshernagar, Bihar, India

== Other ==
- Shamshir (horse) (born 1988), British-trained Thoroughbred racehorse
- Shamshera, 2022 Indian period-drama action film
