= Bhabhisa =

Taharpur Bhabisa ताहरपुर भाभीसा
- Village
- Nickname: Taharpur Bhabisa
- Country: India
- State: Uttar Pradesh
- District: Shamli
- Established: 1100 AD

Government
  - Type: Gram Panchayat
  - Body: Gram Panchayat
- Elevation: 241 m (791 ft)

Population (2011)
  - Total: approximate 8,500 vote

Languages
  - Official: Hindi, Khadi Hindi
- Time zone: UTC+5:30 (IST)
- PIN: 247775
- Telephone code: +91 / 01398

Taharpur Bhabhisa is a village in Shamli district in Uttar Pradesh state, India.

This is the biggest village in terms of voters and area in the Shamli District . This village has beautiful roadside plantation and most clean village according to the Swacch Bharat Abhiyan In the Shamli District of Uttar Pradesh .Brahmin and Jaat is the major community in village.

== Geography ==
Taharpur Bhabhisa has an average elevation of 240 metres (790 ft). The Postal Code is 247775 and Situated near the town Kandhla 5 km away from the town Kandhla and 2.5 km away from the Kandhla Railway Station . Some nearby villages are in the same postal code, including Dangrol (डांगरोल), Kaniyan (कनियान), Hurmajpur (हुरमजपुर), Shahpur (साहपुर), Bharsi (भारसी), and Sunna (सुन्ना). The village is chiefly inhabited by farmers who grow wheat, sugarcane and other cash crops.

There are several religion and castes are living in the Village including Hindus , Muslims , Harijans. There are majority of Hindus. Most of the lands are owned by Brahmans and Jaat's who work primarily as Kishans (Farmer). The Brahamans are from Bhardwaj Gotra where as The Jats are from Jawla Gotra and Budhiyan Khap, kundu gotra, chhikara gotra, nain gotra. The village is accessible from Delhi and Saharanpur via National Highway 709 B as the village is situated near the Kandhla.It can also be access from the Meerut via Garhi-Shekhawatpur located on the Meerut- Karnal National Highway 58.The village has ancient Hindu temple of Lord Shiva and Maa Durga which are said to be more than 300 years old temples and a Temple on the main roadKandhla - Budhana marg .The village also has two Arya Samaj Bhawan from which the lessons of Vedas are learned.There is a Shaheed Bhagat Singh statue which is established in front of a Janta park and at every Independence day(India) 15 August, Republic Day(India) 26th January Shaheed Bhagat Singh birth anniversary 28 September and Shaheed Diwas 23rd March there is patriotic program organised by the people of Taharpur Bhabhisa to remember the contribution of Shaheed Bhagat Singh and are widely celebrated. Thus on these occasions the Gram Panchayat along with Sarpanch provided flowers and holly offering to the statue of the Shaheed Bhagat Singh. The people of Taharpur Bhabhisa has access to the financial and Transaction services of The Indian Government through the Banking facility of the UCO Bank Branch of Taharpur Bhabhisa. There is also a newly setup bank branch of Punjab National Bank . There is also a Post Office for the sharing information through the letters or Speed Post. Most of the government documents comes via this post office in Taharpur Bhabhisa. The children of the village has the access to the basic as well as primary education as There are three primary schools, one middle school, one Kasturba Gandhi Vidhalaya, one inter-college for only girls (Gayatri Devi Kanya Intermediate College) and There are one veterinary hospital on main road. The government provide fertilizers to farmers as there is a Government fertilizer tributary IIFCO centre in the village.

== Weather ==
The weather of Taharpur Bhabhisa can broadly be classified as a tropical monsoon . The India Meteorological Department(IMD) designates four official seasons in Taharpur Bhabhisa such as : Winter, from December to early April. Summer or pre-monsoon, from April to June (April to July) The maximum temperature is close to 43–45 °C (109–113 °F) and minimum temperature is close to 4–5 °C (39–41 °F).

== Notable persons ==
Chaudhary Satyaveer Singh (Chaudhary Budiyan Khap), Retd. Inspector(UP Police) and President medal awardee

Dr. Utkarsh kumar Jawla (MBBS, MS, FISCP, FAIS, FCLS, FIAGES) Professor and surgeon in Kalpana Chawla Government Medical College, Karnal, Haryana.
