= Tomb of Shamsher Khan =

Tomb of Shamsher Khan may refer to these Monuments of National Importance in India:

- Tomb of Shamsher Khan (Batala), Mughal-era tomb in Batala, Punjab, India
- Tomb of Shamsher Khan (Shamshernagar), Shamshernagar, Bihar, India

== See also ==
- Shamshir (disambiguation)
