= PNS Shamsheer =

PNS Shamsheer or PNS Shamsher also sometimes PNS Shamshir, meaning "sword", may refer to the following ships of Pakistan Navy:

- PNS Shamsher (K392); ex HMS Nadder (K392), a River-class frigate, transferred first to the Royal Indian Navy in 1945, and on Partition, in 1947, to Pakistan
- PNS Shamsheer (1969), the former British Leander-class Type 12 frigate HMS Diomede (F16); acquired by the Pakistan Navy in July 1988
- PNS Shamsheer (F-252), is Zulfiquar-class frigate built by Hudong-Zhonghua Shipyard in China; commissioned by the Pakistan Navy in January 2010

== See also ==
- IRIS Shamshir (P227) of the Iranian Navy
- Shamshir (disambiguation)
