= Shampur =

- Village
- Location in Punjab, India Shampur (India)
- Coordinates: 31.0773449°N 75.6552954°E
- Country: India
- State: Punjab
- District: Jalandhar

Government
  - Type: Panchayat raj
  - Body: Gram panchayat
- Elevation: 240 m (790 ft)

Population (2011)
  - Total: 654
- Sex ratio 313/341 ♂/♀

Languages
  - Official: Punjabi
- Time zone: UTC+5:30 (IST)
- PIN: 144037
- Telephone: 01821
- ISO 3166 code: IN-PB
- Post office: Pasla
- Website: jalandhar.nic.in

Shampur is a village in Jalandhar district of Punjab State, India. It is located 5 kilometres (3.1 mi) from the postal head office in Pasla, 15.2 kilometres (9.4 mi) from Phillaur, 35.4 kilometres (22.0 mi) from the district headquarter at Jalandhar and 126 kilometres (78 mi) from the state capital at Chandigarh. The village is administrated by a sarpanch who is an elected representative of village.

== Transport ==
Gumtali Halt is the nearest railway station and Phillaur Junction is 14.6 kilometres (9.1 mi) away. The village is 44.5 kilometres (27.7 mi) from the domestic airport in Ludhiana and the nearest international airport are in Chandigarh and the Sri Guru Ram Dass Jee International Airport which is 128 kilometres (80 mi) away in Amritsar.
