= Phillaur Fort =

Fort at Phillaur

- Grand Trunk Road; Near Phillaur in India
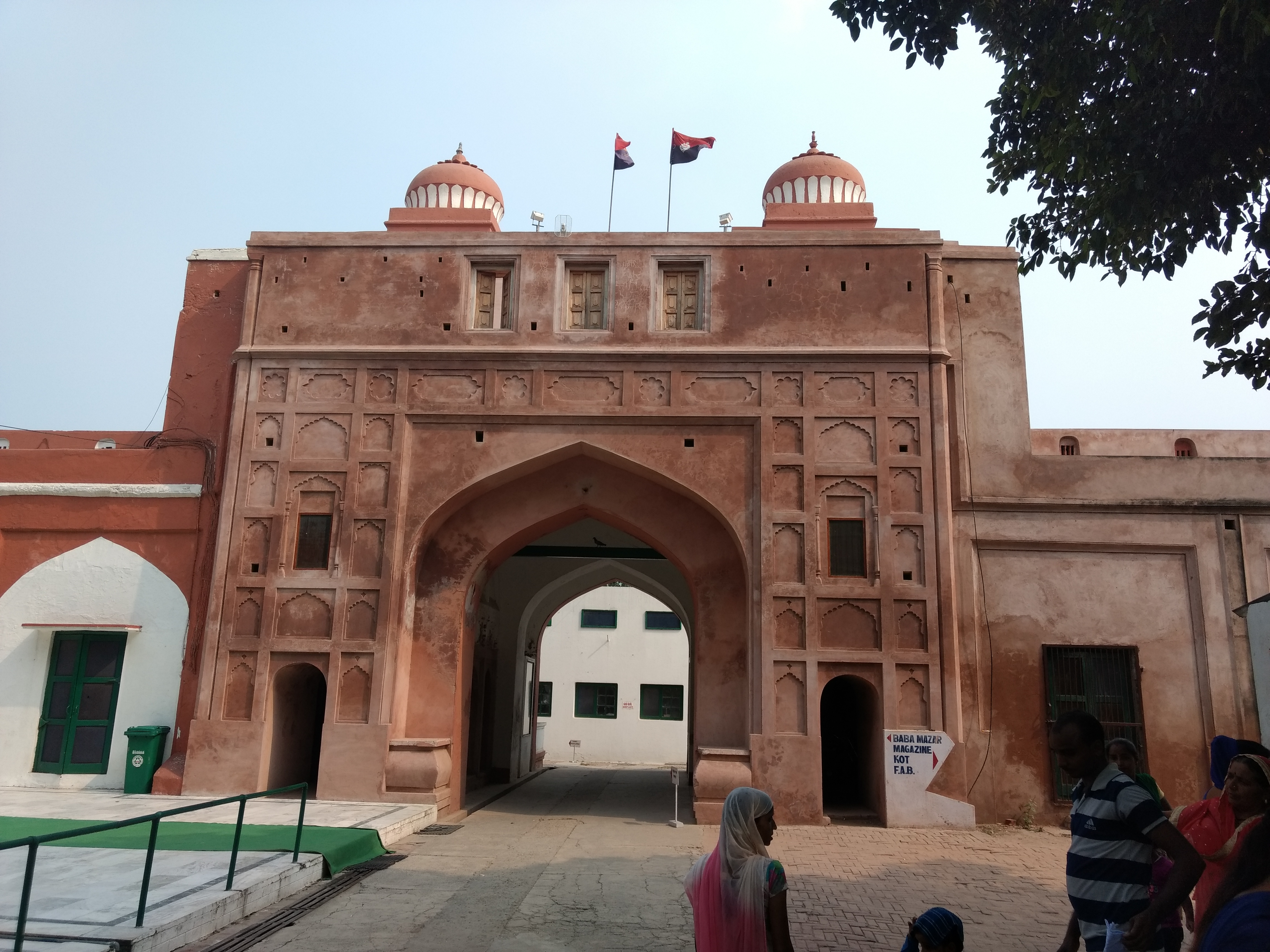

Site information
- Type: Fort
- Operator: Maharaja Ranjit Singh Punjab Police Academy

Location
- Location within India
- Coordinates: 31.0117°N 75.7898°E

Phillaur Fort or Maharaja Ranjit Singh Fort is located on the Grand Trunk Road in Phillaur, Punjab, India.

== History ==
During the reign of Shah Jahan (1628-1658) an Imperial sarai was constructed here and in 1809 it was rebuilt as a fort under the rule of Maharaja Ranjit Singh (1780–1839). It was designed by Dewan Mohkam Chand, with the assistance of Ranjit Singh's French and Italian generals. It was constructed as a response to the British, who built a Fort in nearby Ludhiana.

Phillaur Fort was officially known as Maharaja Ranjit Singh Fort. It is a historic red-brick citadel on the Grand Trunk Road in Punjab, originally built as a Mughal-era sarai under Shah Jahan (1628–1658) and later transformed into a formidable military stronghold by Maharaja Ranjit Singh in 1809 with European architectural influences. After the Sikh defeat in the Battle of Aliwal (1846), the British took possession, repurposing it as an artillery depot and, by 1891, converting it into India's oldest police training academy. The fort complex also houses the revered shrine of Pir Baba Abdullah Shah Ji, adding to its cultural significance. Today, it remains both an architectural landmark and a live police academy, although its custodianship under Punjab Police has sparked debate over heritage access.

== Architecture ==
The fort's architecture has a distinct European character, with channels dug out along the boundary of the fort, watchtowers on the two gateways, four bastions on four nooks high walls around the fort. It features an extensive moat and inward-sloping outer walls engineered to deflect artillery fire, alongside watchtowers atop both eastern (Delhi Gate) and western (Lahori Gate) gateways, each with distinctive three-storey height and decorative chajjas over richly niche-lined facades. The fortress walls are punctuated by four robust bastions at its corners and additional bastions along the ramparts enhanced by Parapets and chemin de ronde walkways. Within, the mortar-built ramparts encircle structures such as the Police Training College, director's residence, and Finger Print Bureau, preserving the fort's functional lineage.

== Gallery ==
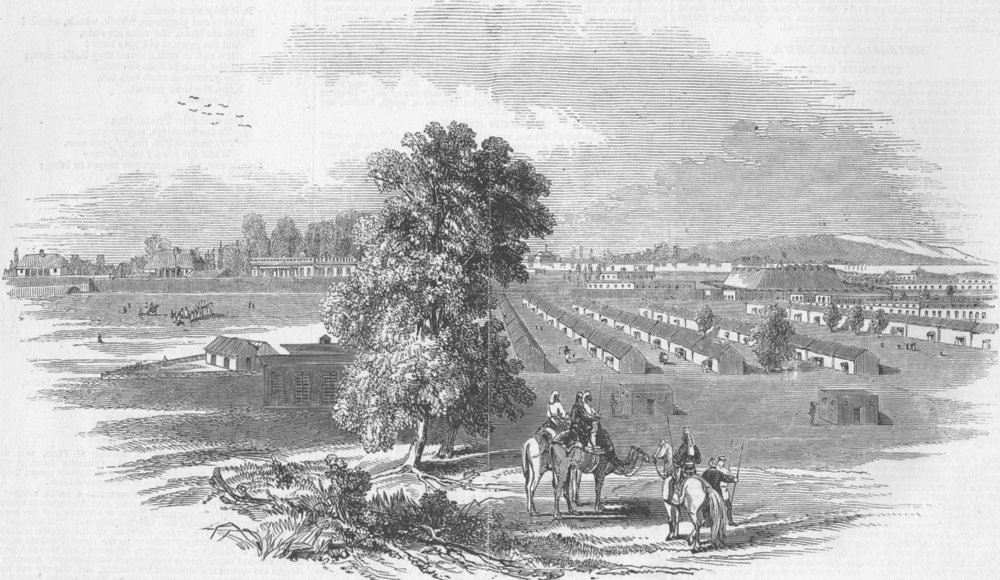
The Fort of Phulloor, on the Punjaub side of the Sutlej in 1846

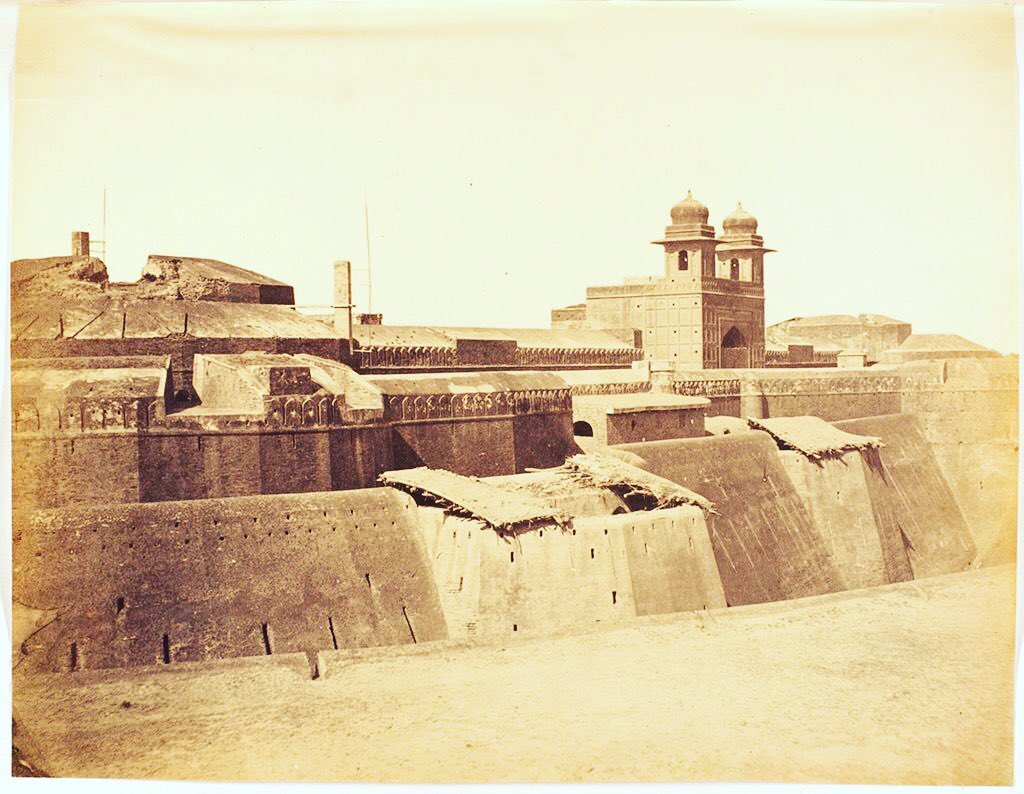
Fort of "Philoor" (Phillaur) on the Sutlej River, ca.1858–61
