= Tut Kalan =

- Village
- Country: India
- State: Punjab
- District: Jalandhar

Languages
  - Official: Punjabi
- Time zone: UTC+5:30 (IST)
- PIN: 144040
- Vehicle registration: PB- 08

Tut Kalan is a village in Nakodar. Nakodar is a city in the district Jalandhar of Indian state of Punjab.

Tut Kalan lies on the Nakodar-Kapurthala road which is almost 1 km from it.

The nearest railway station to this village Nakodar railway station at a distance of 5 km.
