= Tombs of Ustad-Shagird, Nakodar =

Two Mughal-era tombs in Punjab, India

Tombs of Ustad-Shagird
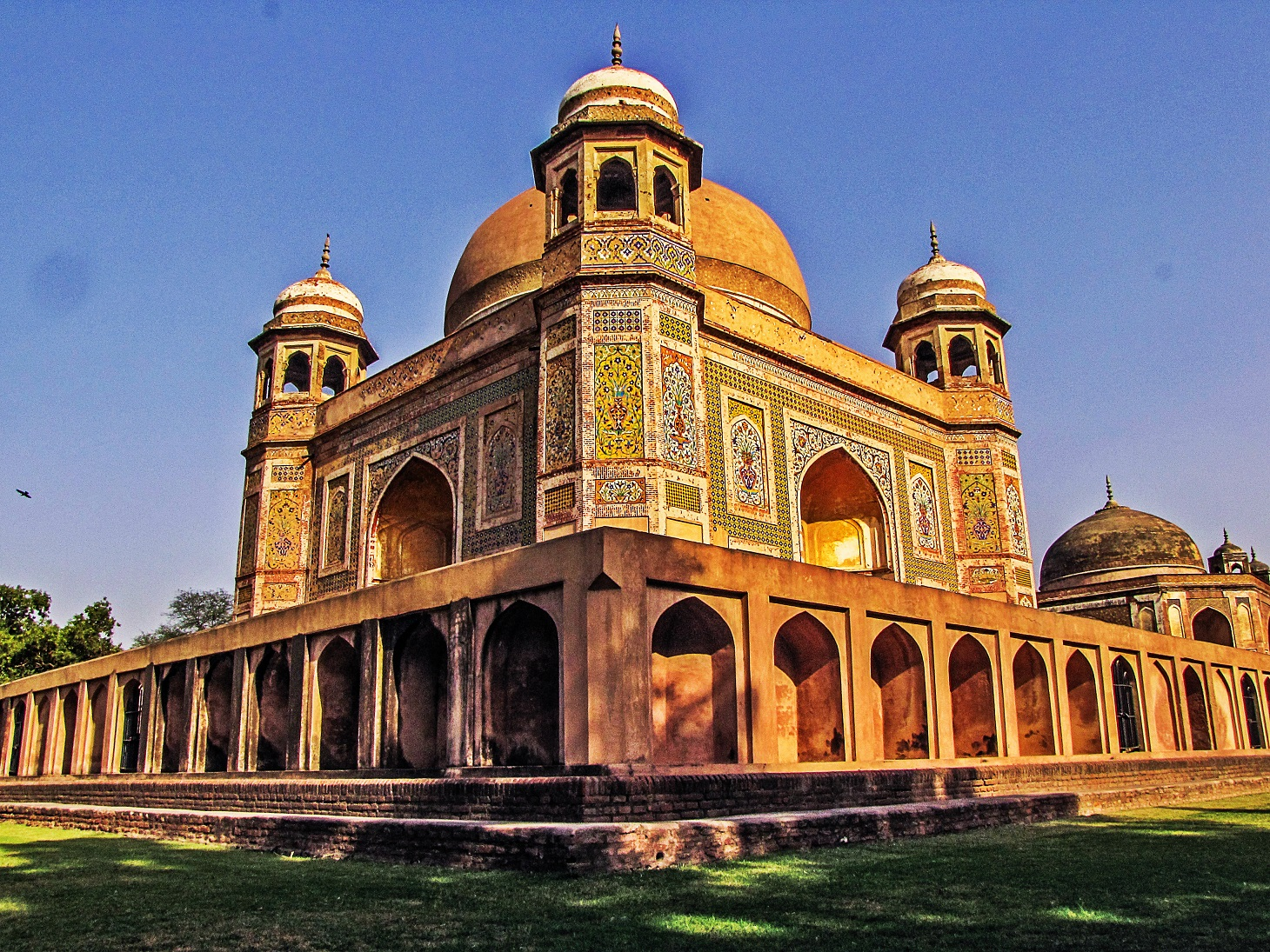
- The Tomb of Shagird
- Interactive map of Tombs of Ustad-Shagird
- Location: Nakodar, Jalandhar district, Punjab, India
- Coordinates: 31.1283°N 75.4747°E
- Built: 17th century
- Architectural style: Mughal Architecture

The Tombs of Ustad-Shagird are two Mughal-era tombs in the town of Nakodar in Jalandhar district, Punjab, India.

== History ==
In Hindi and Urdu, the word Ustad refers to teacher, and Shagird means student or disciple.

The Tomb of Ustad is of Muhammad Mumin Hussaini, a musician and nobleman from the time of Jahangir, as identified by an inscription on the tomb dating it to 1612–13 CE.

The Tomb of Shagird is of Haji Jamal, the student of Mumin Hussaini, and dates to 1657, during the reign of Shah Jahan. The similarity of the inscriptions, both in terms of the same chapters and verses of the Quran as well as the style of writing, point to both being done by the same calligrapher.

== Description ==
These tombs had been built during the Mughal period amidst a garden called the Hadironwala Bagh (Garden of the Tombs). The garden does not exist anymore. The tombs themselves are great examples of Mughal architecture.

On the west of the tombs is a gateway said to have been built in 1667 CE. There is another smaller gateway on the east, now in ruins. To the north is a tank, and on one side of it is a summer house. Beyond the tank is a baradari containing the shrine of Bahadur Khan who died during the reign of Jahangir, and also an old mosque which is now in a dilapidated condition.

== See also ==
- Tombs of Ustad-Shagird, Sirhind
