= Kaniyan, Shamli =

Village in Uttar Pradesh, India

Kaniyan is a village consisting of a gram panchayat, Block Kandhla, Tehsil Shamli, District Shamli in the northern state of Uttar Pradesh situated in the Doab region of River Ganga and Yamuna.

Kaniyan is located 237 m (778 ft) above mean sea level.

== History ==
This village is said to be found in the year 940 AD by Chaudhary Ratan Paudiya. Residents of this villages are Poriya and their ancestor is said to be King Puru who fought in the Battle of Hydaspes in 326 BC against Alexander The Great.

== Demographics ==
There are about 2336 residents in this village majority of whom are Hindu Jats according to 2011 census by the Government of India. Main occupation in this village is agriculture and majority of youth is serving the nation mainly in police and armed forces of India.

== Development ==
Yuva Shakti Kaniyan is an organization started by the residents in 22 Dec 2018 for maintaining and developing the village. It mainly focuses on the education, sports, planting trees and encouraging youth for a better future.

Chaudhary Ratan Paudiya Sports Complex was built with efforts and contributions of local residents, Yuva Shakti Kaniyan and Gram Panchayat.

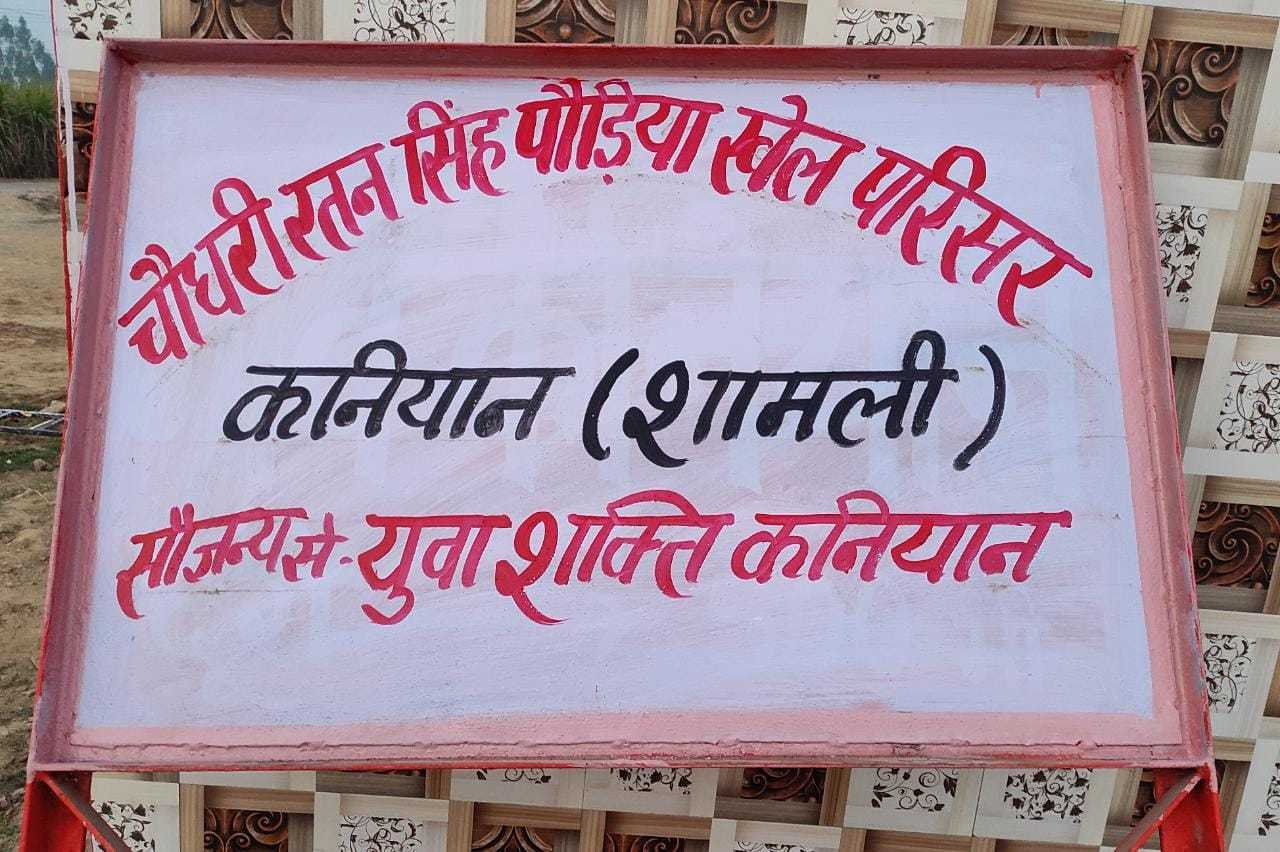
Chaudhary Ratan Paudiya Sports Complex

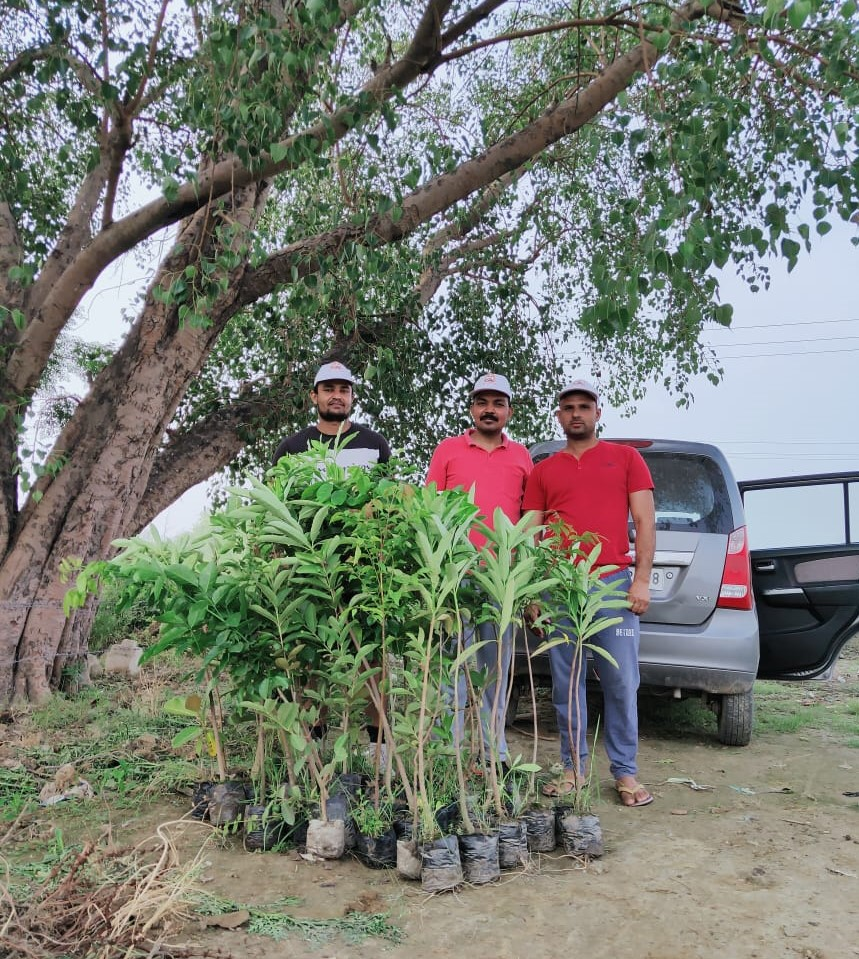
Plantation Drive in Kaniyan on World Environment Day.

== Education ==
There are total of 3 schools in the village. Two are primary schools and one is from class 6th to 8th. The closest High School and Inter College are in the nearby Town of Ailum.

Gargi Vedic Kanya Gurukul is a UP board affiliated school from classes 6th to 8th for free education to girls. It was started in 2011 with the donations collected by the local residents without any government financial aid. It has all the modern facilities including computer labs, mess and lodgings for students.

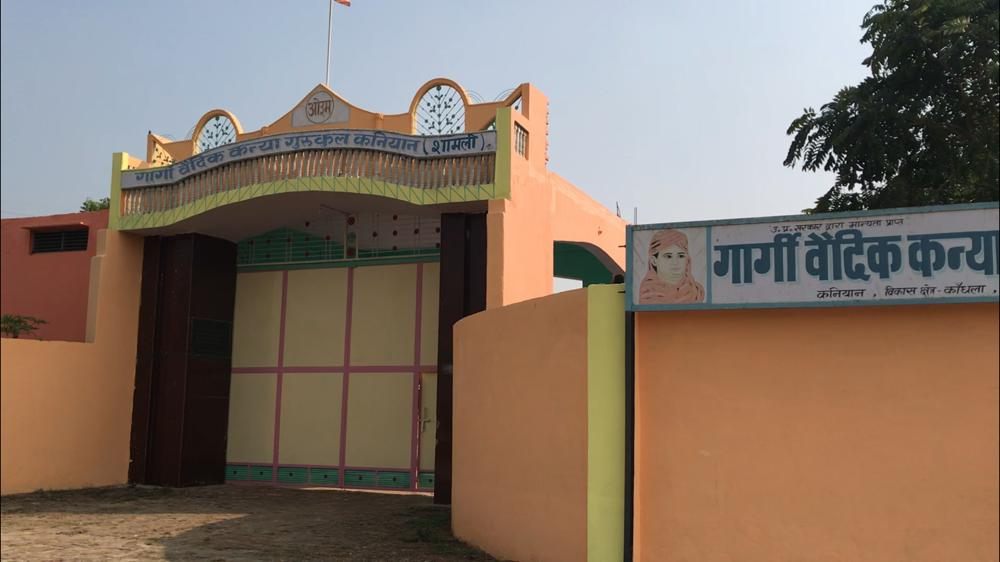
Gargi Vedic Kanya Gurukul (Front Gate)

== Politics and government ==
The Sarpanch of the Gram Panchayat is Sarika Devi. The first Sarpanch was Anoop Singh elected in 1951. It comes under the constituency of Kairana in Lok Sabha and constituency of Shamli in Vidhan Sabha.

== Law enforcement ==
It comes under the jurisdiction of Kandhla Police Station. Crime rate in this village is very low. The nearest Police Outpost is in Ailum.

== Sports ==
Kabaddi is the most famous and played games in Kaniyan. It has produced many national level players in kabaddi. 46th Senior State Kabaddi Championship was held from 30 Nov to 1 Dec 2019. District Shamli emerged as the winner.

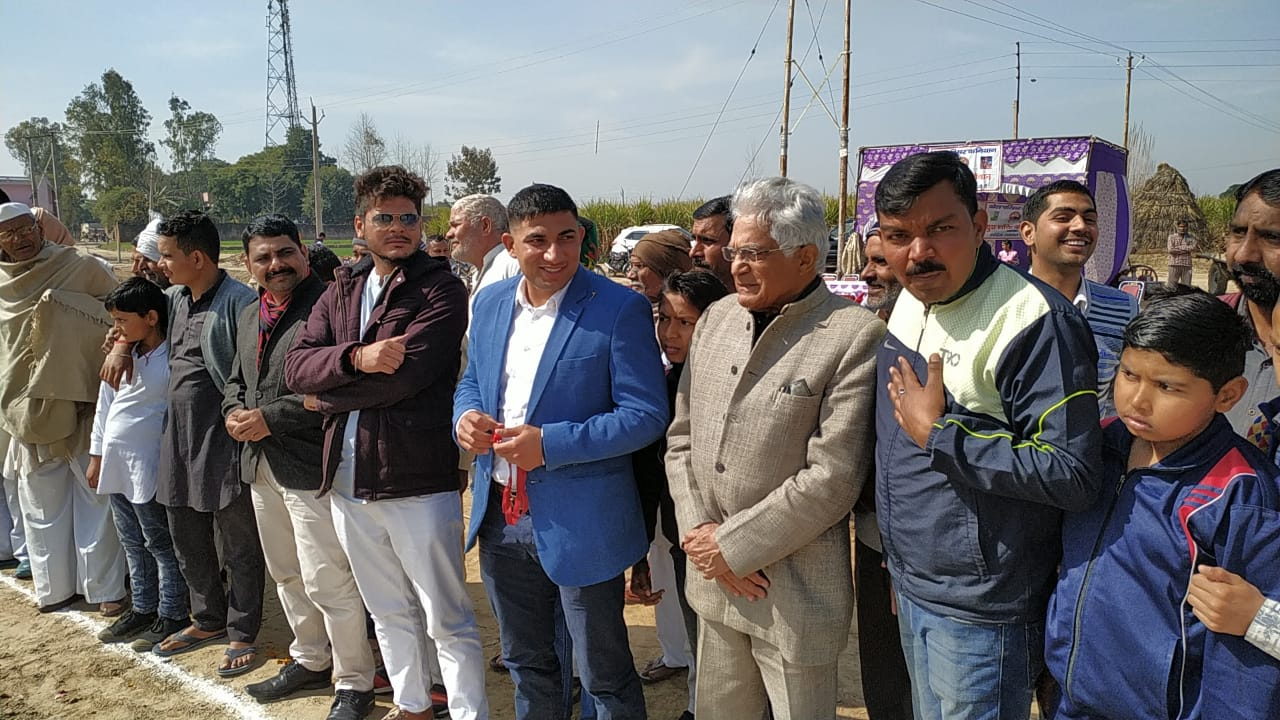
International Kabaddi Player Nitin Tomar (Front row-4th from right) promoting Kabaddi in Kaniyan

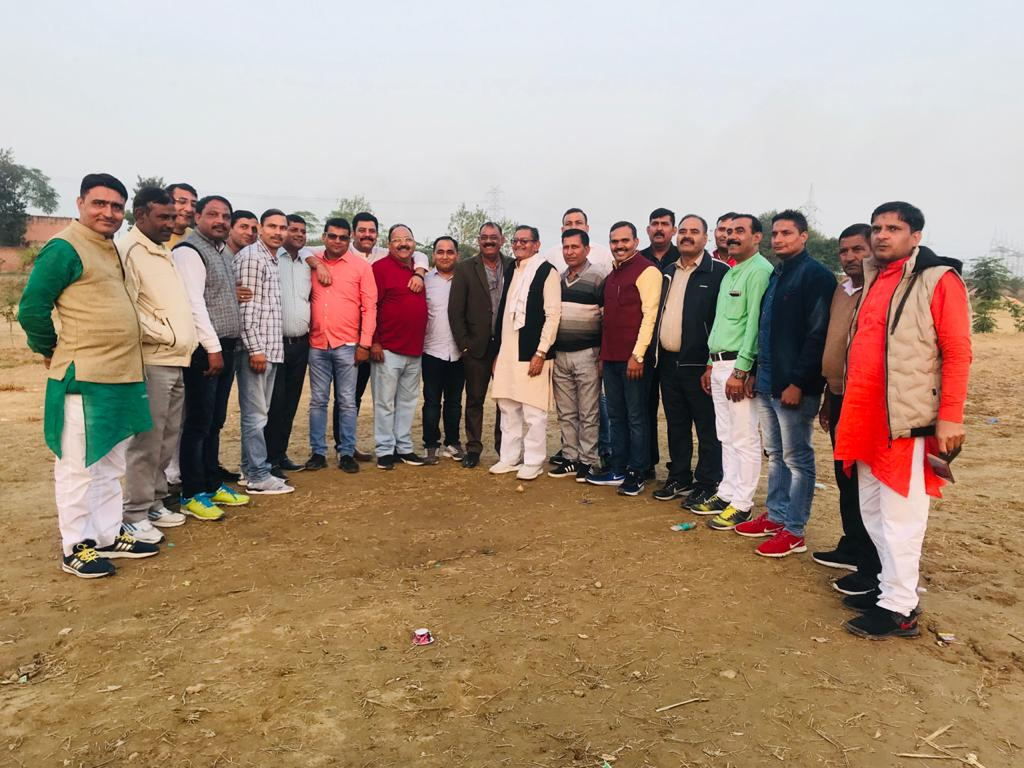
Former Kabaddi Players from Kaniyan and nearby villages

== Transport ==
Ailum railway station is the nearest railway station 3.6 km away. It is 3.6 km away from NH 709-B (Delhi-Saharanpur Highway). Nearest Airport is Indira Gandhi International Airport, Delhi.
