= Mahavir Singh (social reformer) =

Justice Mahavir Singh (1920–1997) was an Indian justice, an authority of law and social reformer of India. He served as justice of the Allahabad High Court from 1977, and continued to provide opinions until his death in 1997.
