= Ram Bagh, Amritsar =

Sikh-era gardens and palace

Ram Bagh Mahal
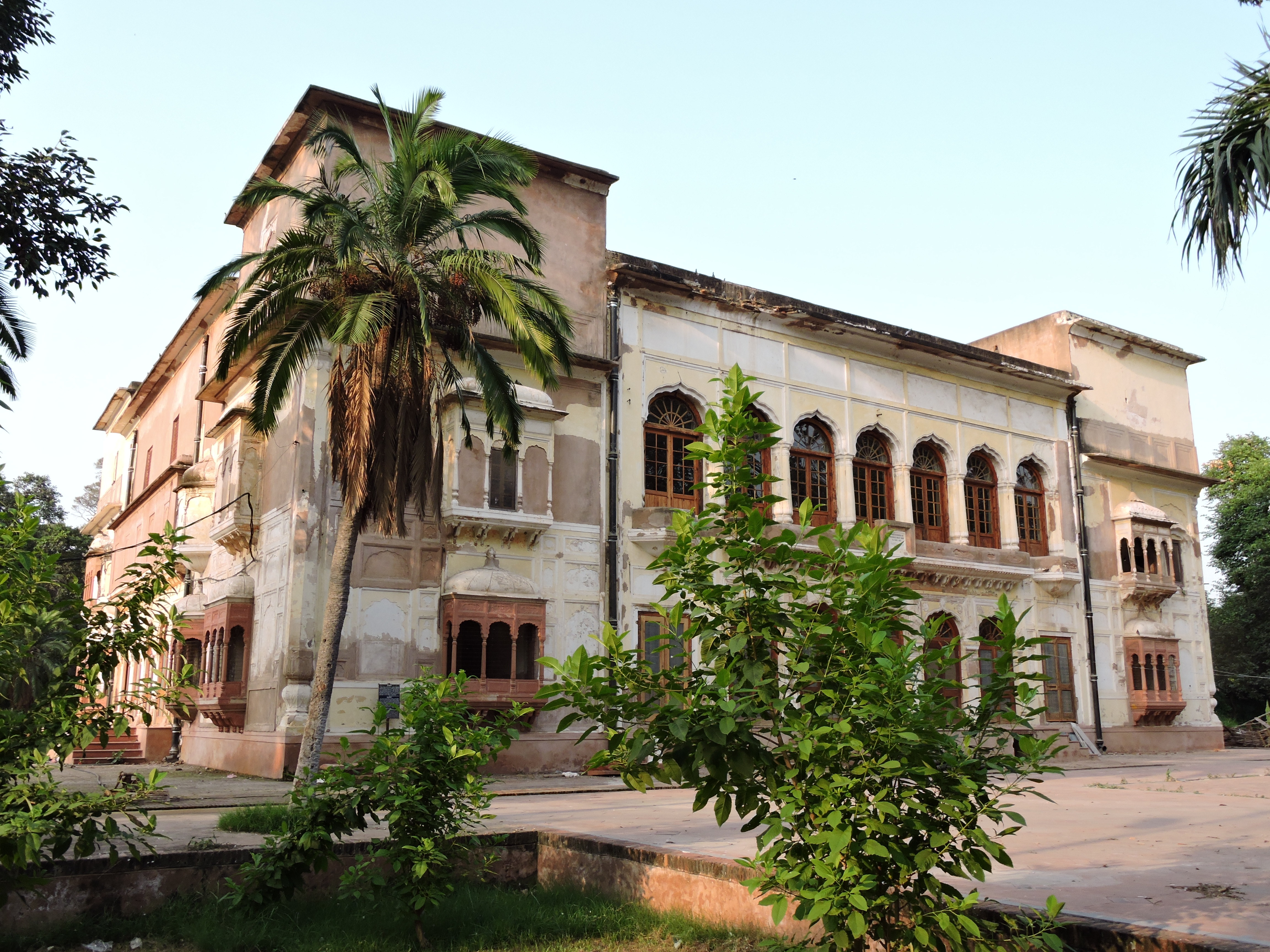
- Ram Bagh Palace, Amritsar
- Interactive map of the Ram Bagh Mahal area

General information
- Architectural style: Sikh architecture
- Location: Ram Bagh Palace, Amritsar Punjab., India
- Coordinates: 31.637813°N 74.878743°E
- Completed: 1831
- Cost: Rs 125000
- Client: Fakir Azizuddin; Desa Singh; Lehna Singh Majithia

Technical details
- Structural system: Red Stone

Ram Bagh is a garden built during the reign of Maharaja Ranjit Singh in Amritsar, Punjab, India. Ram Bagh palace also known as Ram Bagh Mahal, is a palace situated in the centre of this garden, which was used as the summer residence of Ranjit Singh. It was completed in 1831 and is named after the fourth guru of the Sikhs, Guru Ram Das, who founded the city of Amritsar. The whole Ram Bagh complex including the palace and other monuments is both a state protected monument and a monument of national importance. The complex is also at the centre of a long drawn legal battle, which has adversely affected its conservation and restoration.

== History ==
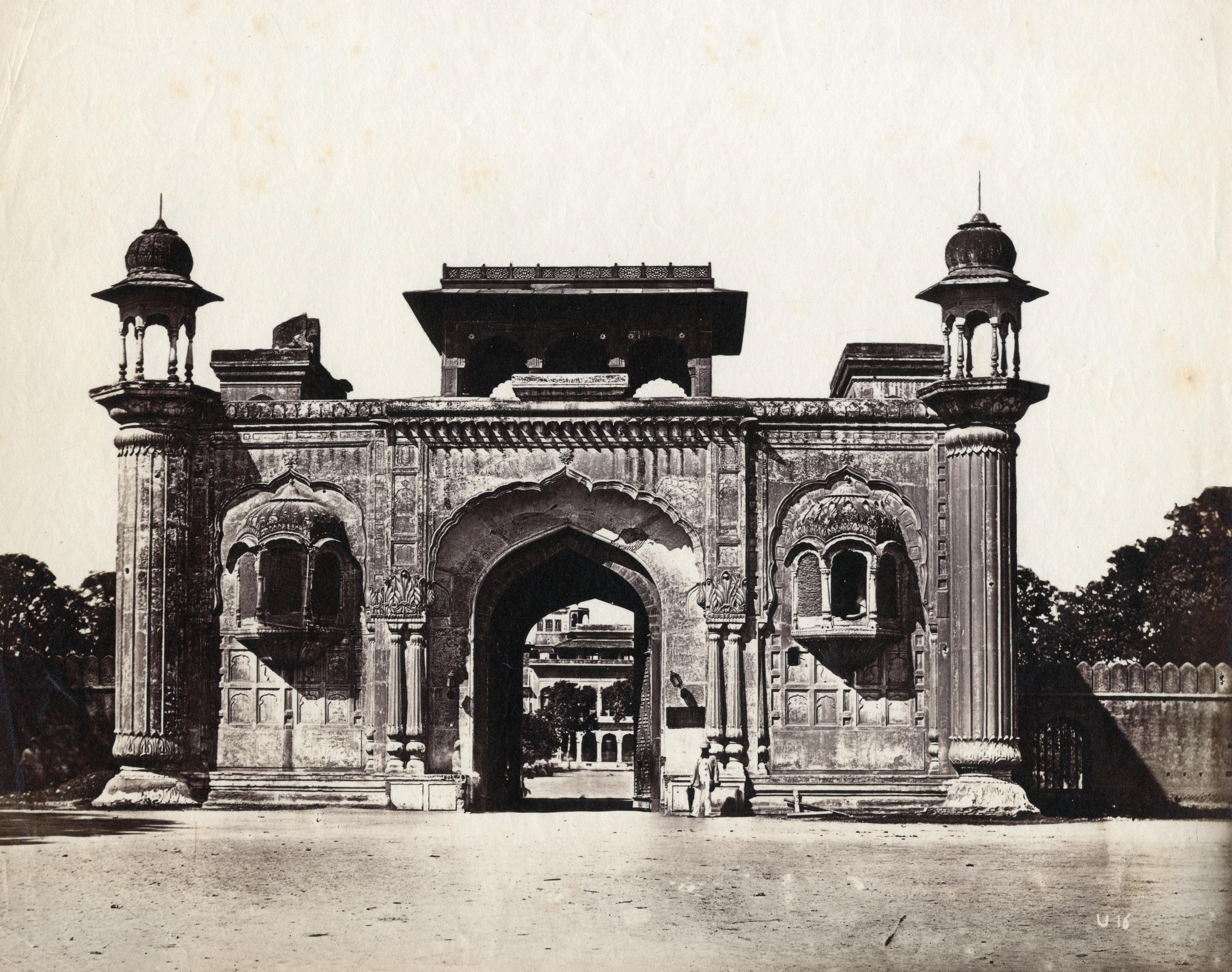
Ram Bagh entrance, photographed 1858-60 by Felice Beato

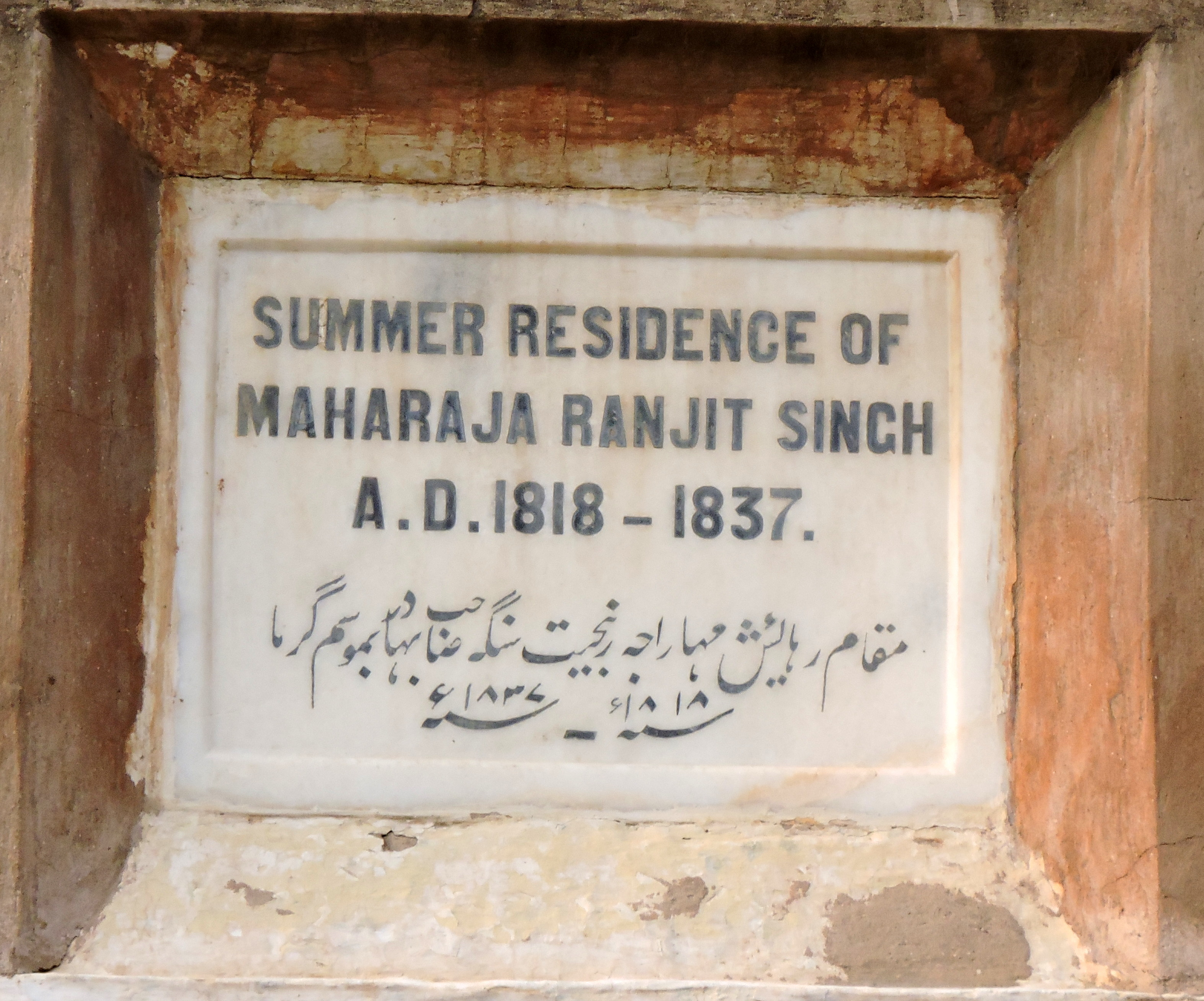
British era plaque at the palace in Ram Bagh

Maharaja Ranjit Singh had a deep interest in the development and beautification of various areas under his rule. Amritsar being the spiritual and cultural centre of Sikhism, and located close to Ranjit Singh's capital, was visited often by him. Thus a palace, with a sprawling garden following the Mughal pattern of Shalimar Bagh in Lahore, was built to serve as residence of the Maharaja in the city. Construction began in 1819 and continued till 1831.

After the death of Maharaja Ranjit Singh and the subsequent collapse of the Sikh Empire, the garden and its buildings were taken over by the British. The garden was renamed Company Bagh after British annexation. The British leased several buildings in the complex to three elite clubs called the Amritsar Club, Lumsden Club and Service Club. These clubs continued to occupy them after the end of British rule.

In 1997, the entire complex including the Palace as well as other buildings and monuments were declared ‘protected’ by the state government, due to threats such as encroachment and lack of conservation. Following this, the complex was declared a Monument of National Importance by the central government in 2004.

== Administration and conservation ==
The garden is under the administration of the Municipal Corporation of the city. However, the restoration and conservation works are done by the Archeological Survey of India. Some buildings are in the possession of three private elite clubs, to whom these buildings were leased by the British. The Municipal Corporation claims that the lease has ended. A case to remove these buildings from the occupation of the clubs is pending before the Punjab and Haryana High Court. NGOs have also pleaded for the transfer of the possession of the garden from MC to ASI. A plantation drive under the Akal Seva Foundation with the permission of the ASI began in May 2026. The trees planted consisted of kaner, bottle king, red rose, orange rose, pink rose, white rose, morpankhi, neem, amla, mulberry (toot), shahtoot, ber and peepal, with 10,000 saplings in total slated for plantation in the garden to improve its natural aesthetic. To ensure the vitality of the trees, proper soil treatment, disease management, structural support, and frequent monitoring will be conducted.

== Major structures ==
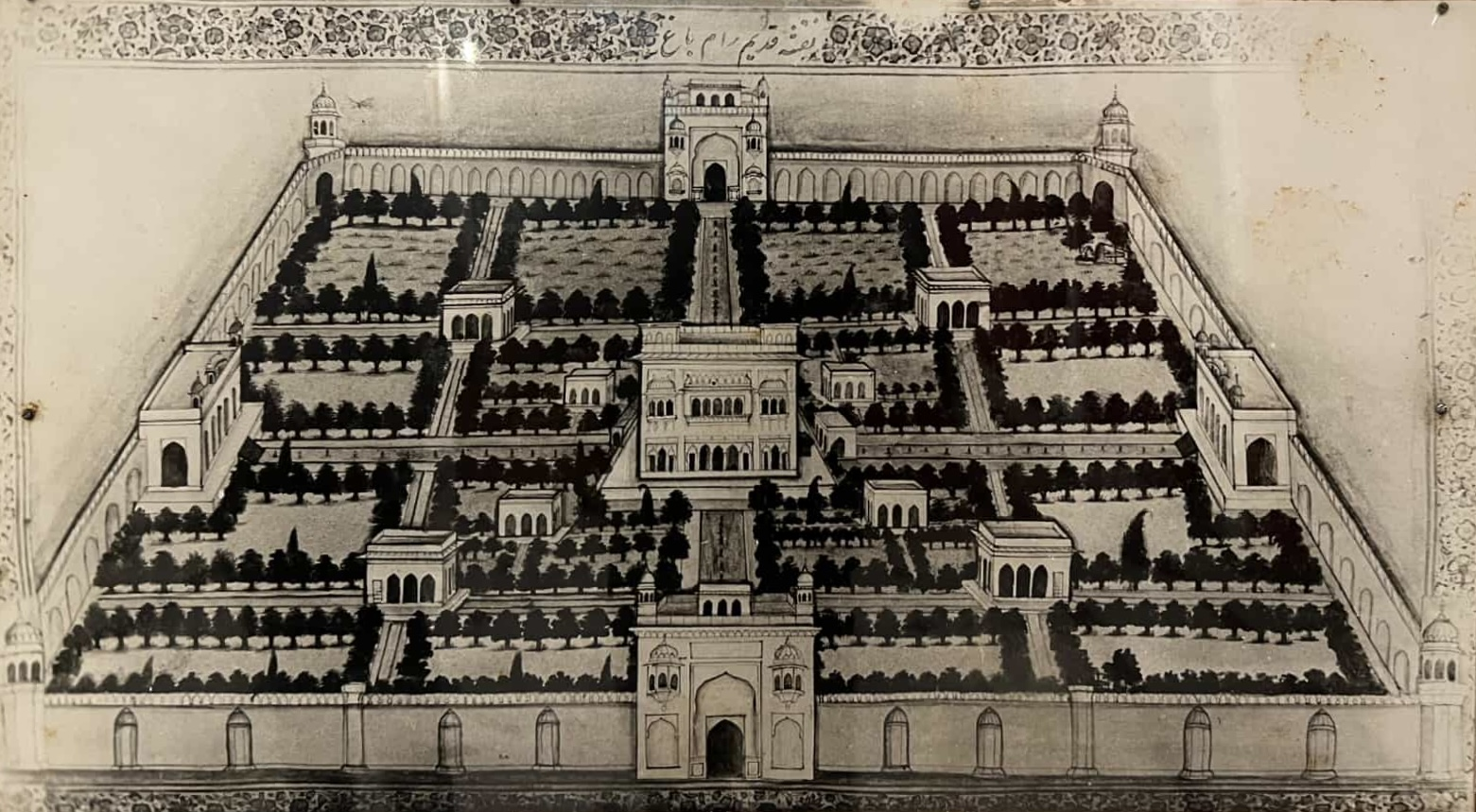
A map of Ram Bagh, Amritsar, from the 'Gulgast-i-Punjab', by Tota Ram, made in 1860

=== Summer Palace ===
The main summer palace building is located in the centre of the garden. It has two storeys and a basement, and was used as residence of the Maharaja in summers when he would most often visit the city.

=== Hammam ===
To the northwest of the main palace lies a hammam-ghar or bath-house. A large pool is located inside the hammam.

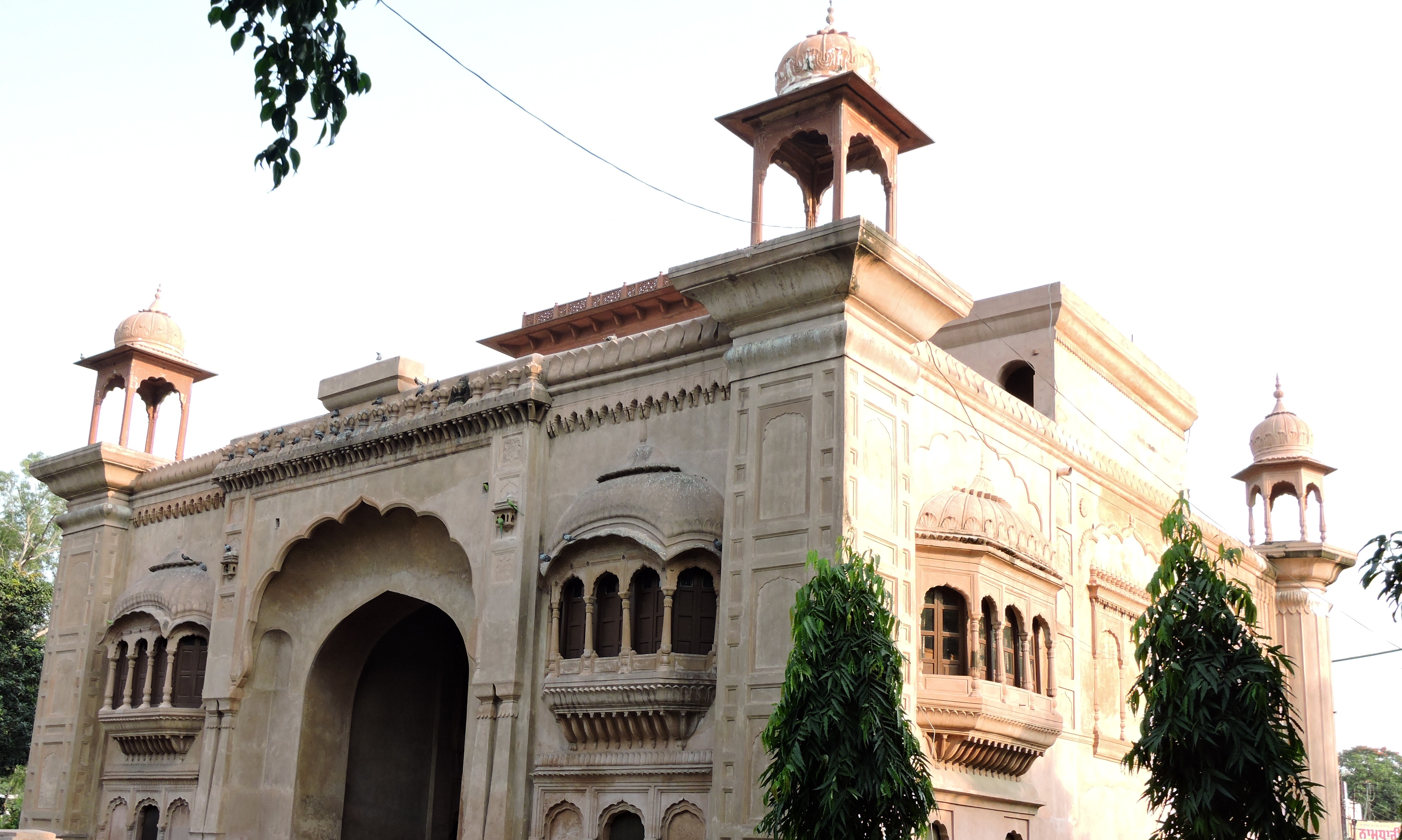
Deorhi, main entrance to the summer palace.

=== Deorhis ===
A large and elaborate deorhi or gateway is located on the southern side of garden, facing towards the direction of the Harmandir Sahib. This served as the main entrance to the garden and palace. It was converted into a museum during British occupation of the gardens. A less elaborate second deorhi is located on the northern end.

=== Walls and watchtowers ===
The garden was originally enclosed by fourteen feet tall walls, though only the foundation of these walls survive today. Four watchtowers are located on the four corners or the garden.

=== Macchi Ghar ===
Located to the east of the summer palace, this building was originally a record room for Maharaja Ranjit Singh's darbar staff. It was turned into an aquarium during British occupation and thereafter called Macchi Ghar (fish house).

=== Munshikhana ===
It is located to the west of the summer palace and used by the staff of the Maharaja.

=== Baradari ===
A red sandstone baradari is located inside the garden.

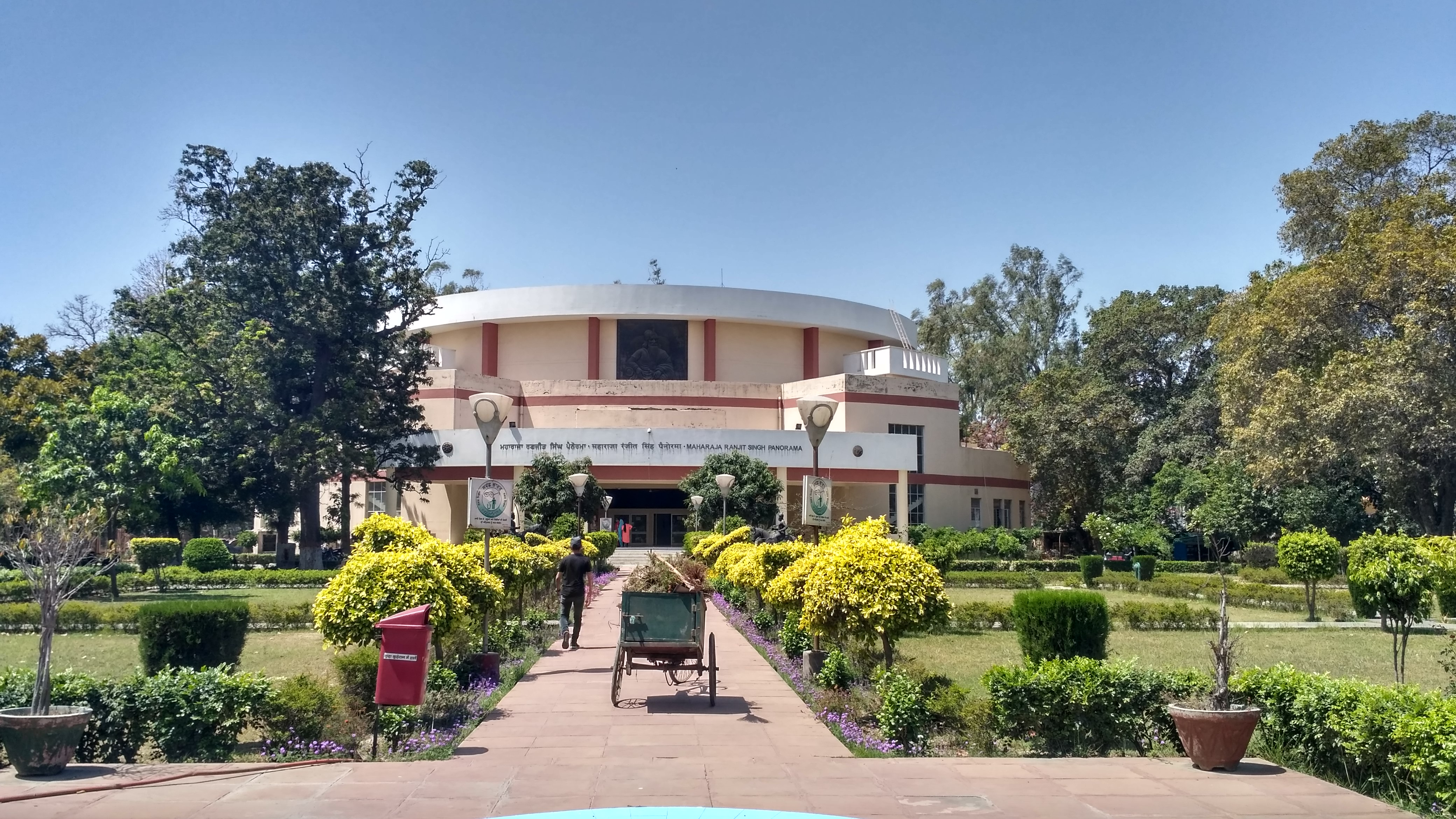
Ranjit Singh Panorama, built in 2006.

=== Other structures ===
Over the years, several structures which were originally not part of the garden complex have come up inside the garden premises, including tennis courts, a skating rink, a children's park, food kiosks, and government offices. Most of these structures date to the British occupation, but many were added post-independence. Many of these structures endanger the garden and its heritage buildings. A memorial gallery called "Ranjit Singh Panorama" was built adjacent to the northwest corner of the garden in 2006.

== Gallery ==
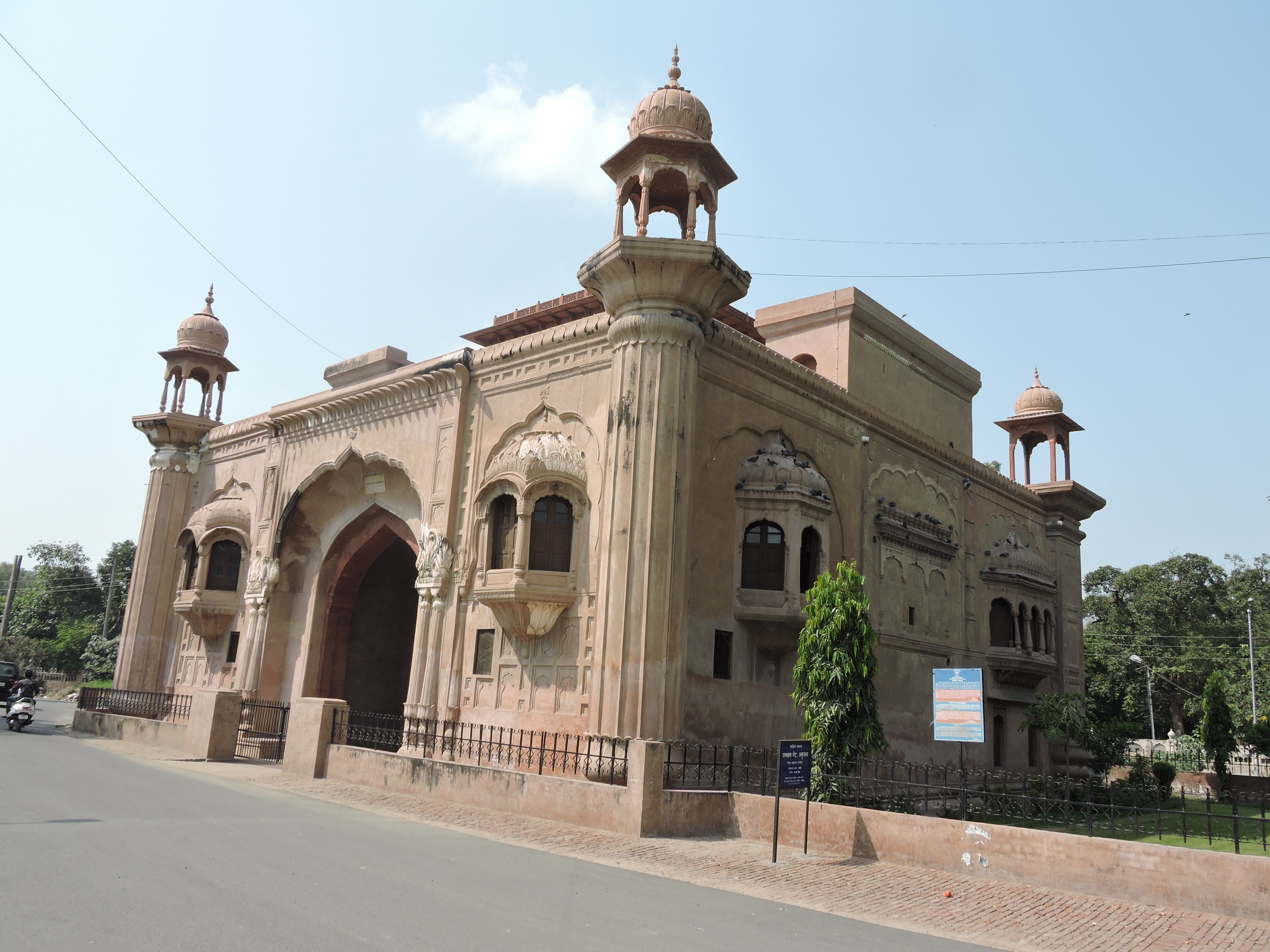
Ram Bagh Deorhi, Amritsar

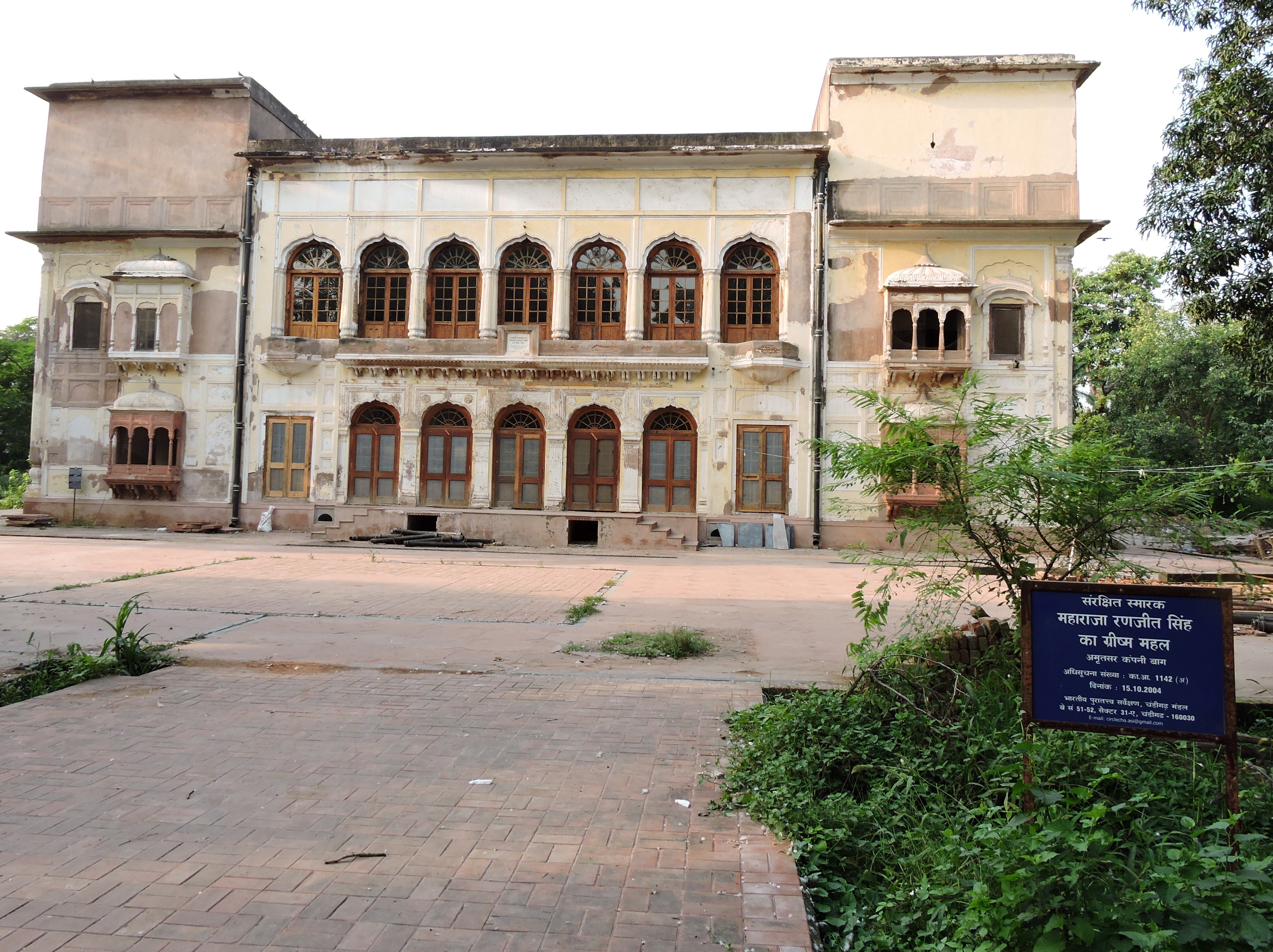
Front view.

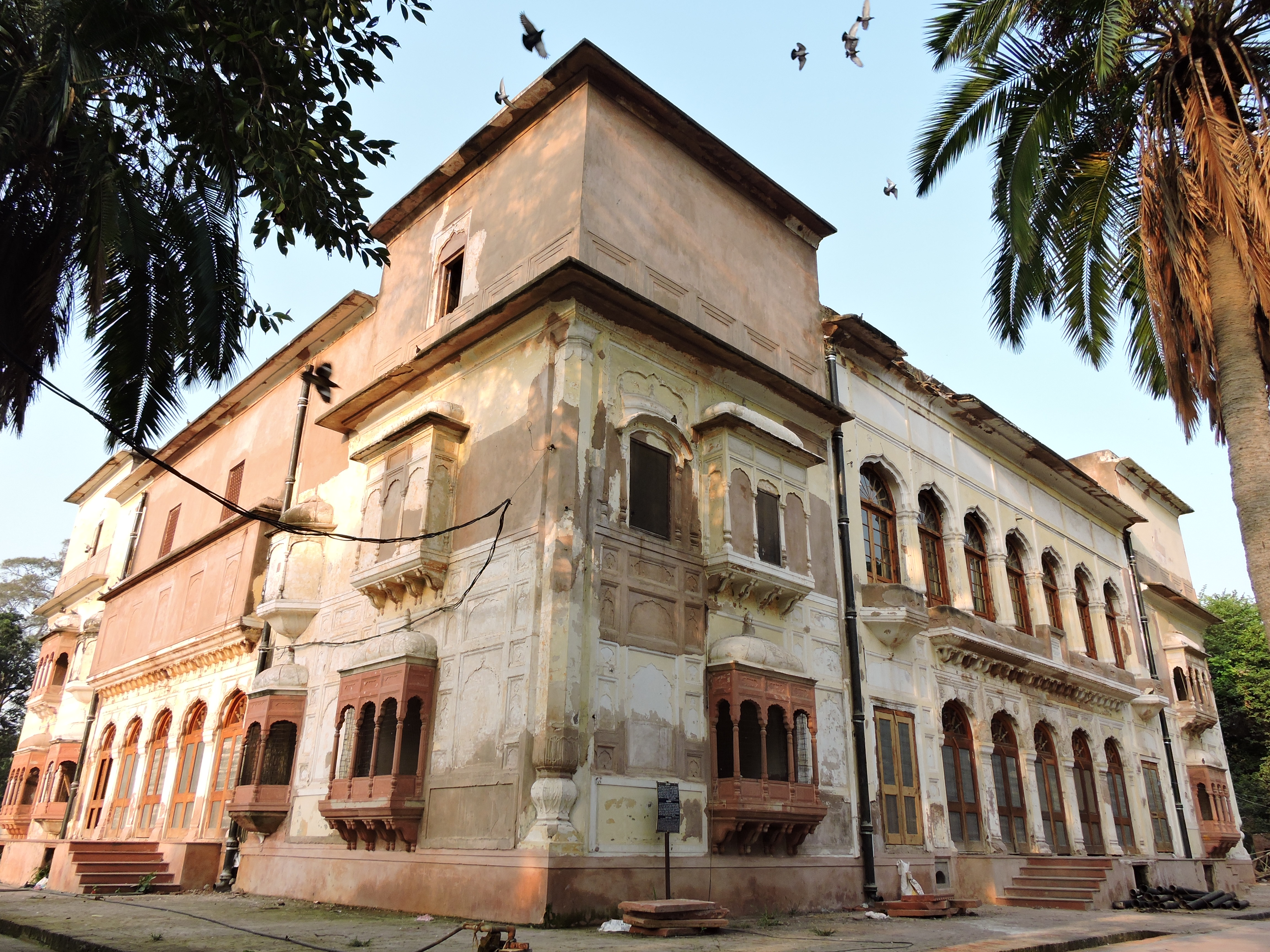
Left and front Side view.

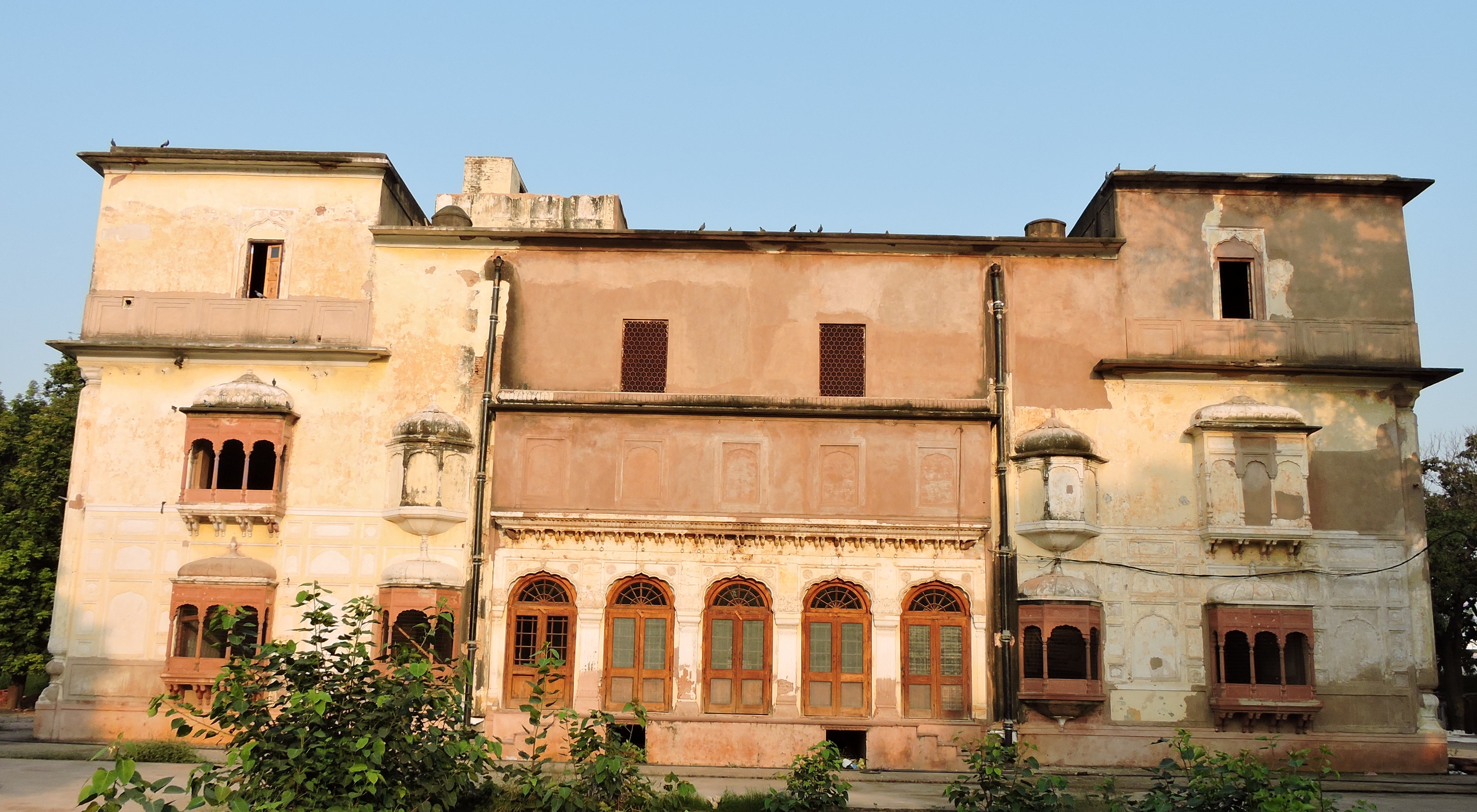
Left side view.

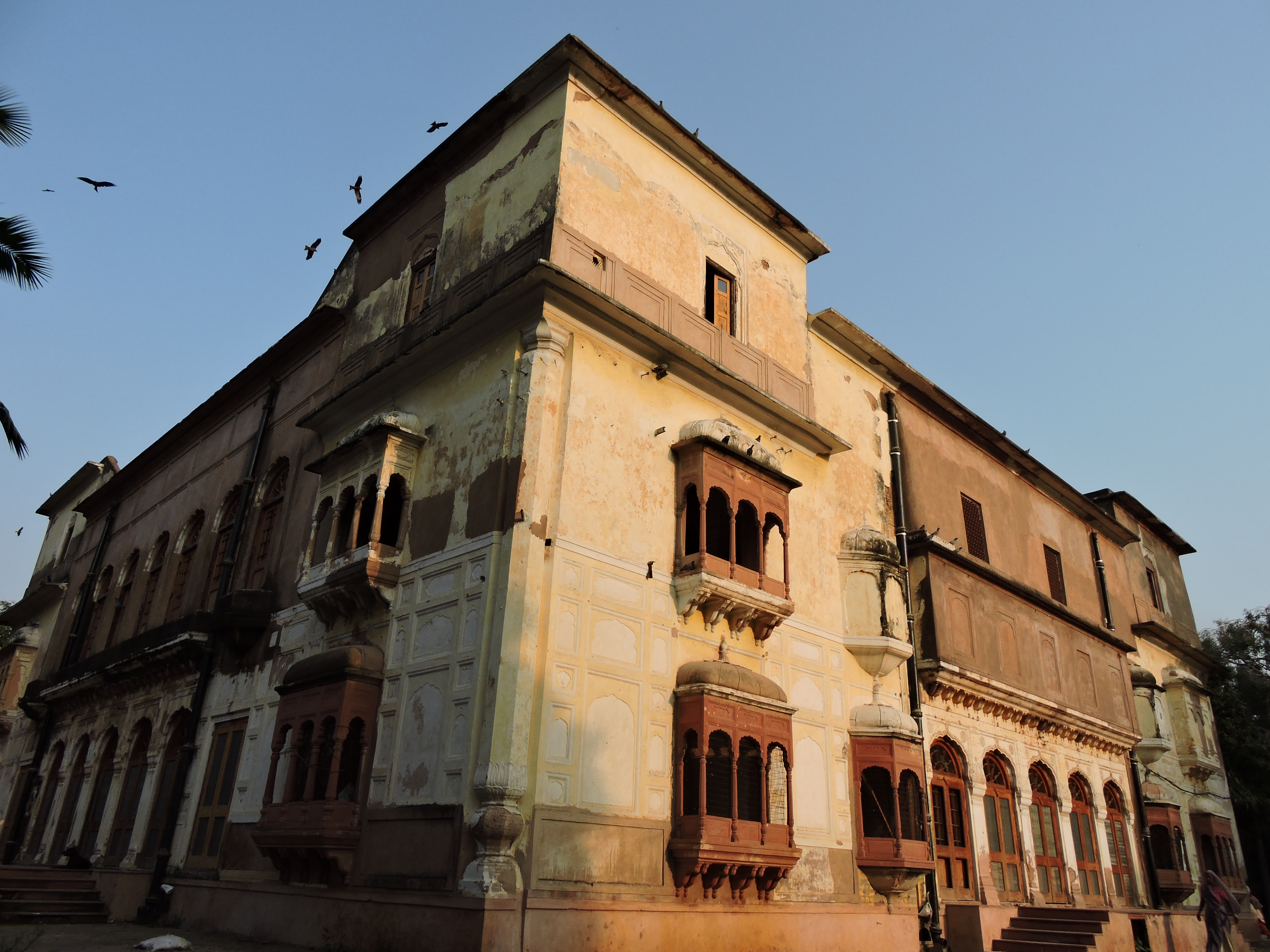
Left and back view.

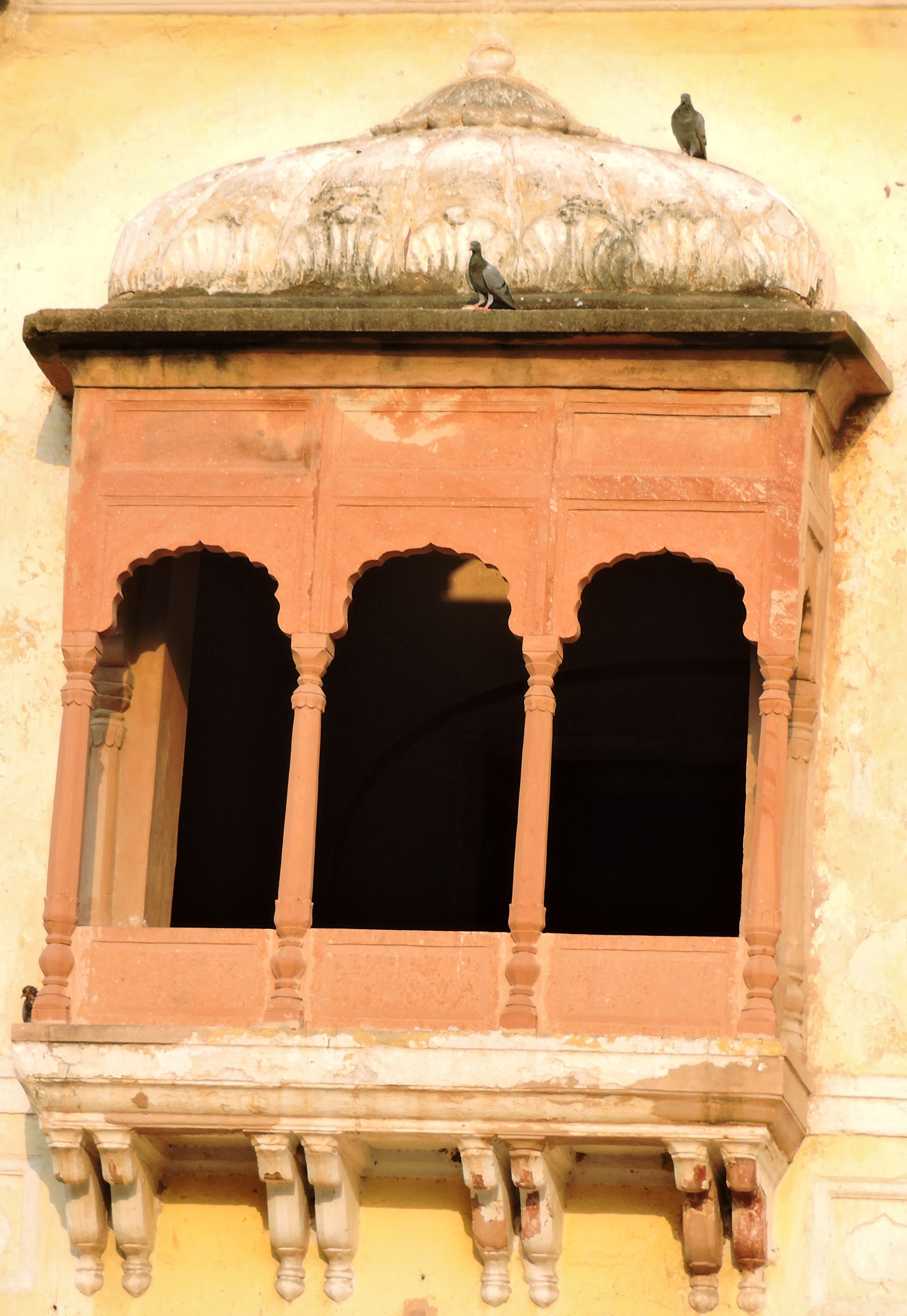
Balcony.

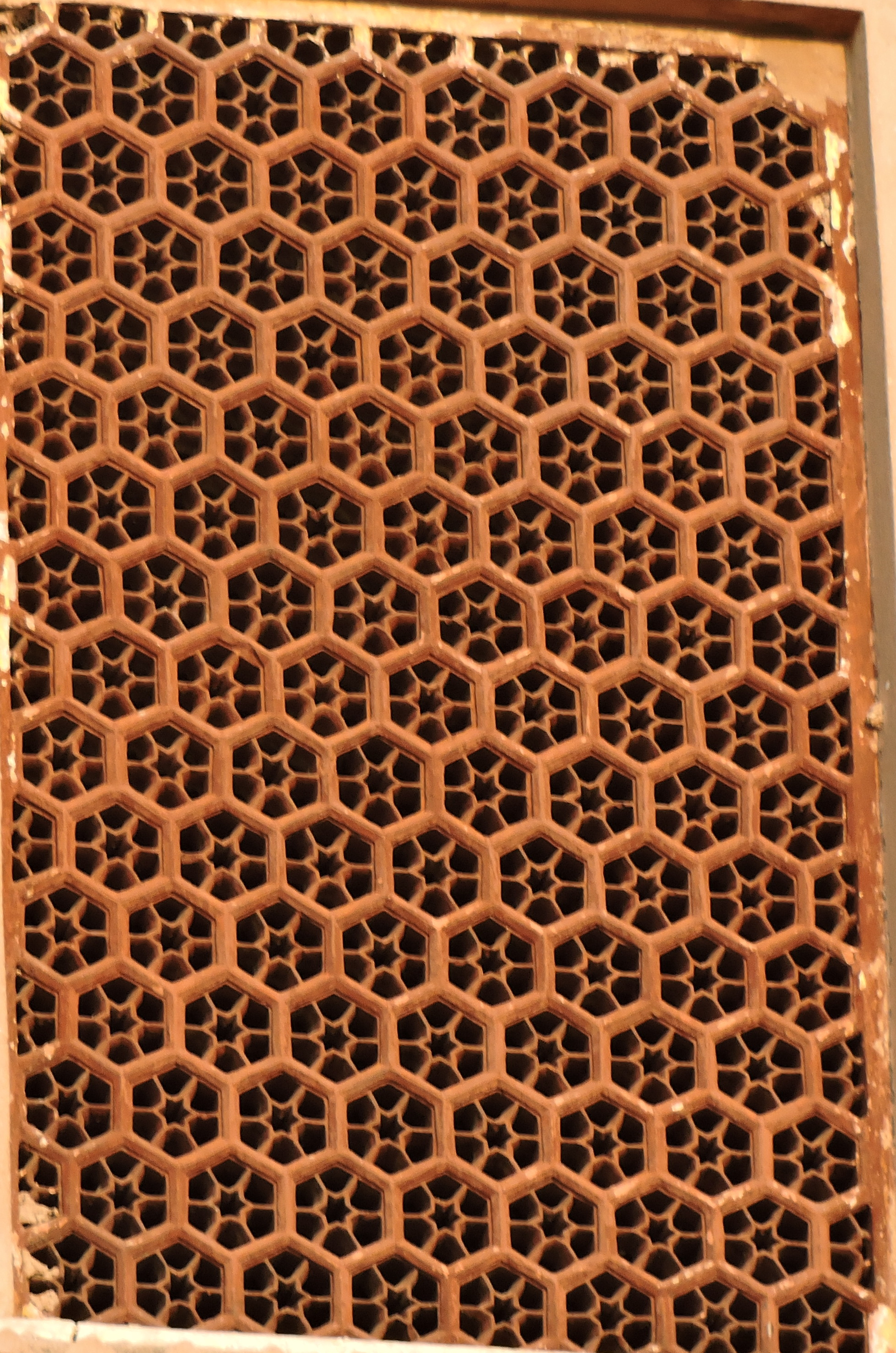
Grill on window.

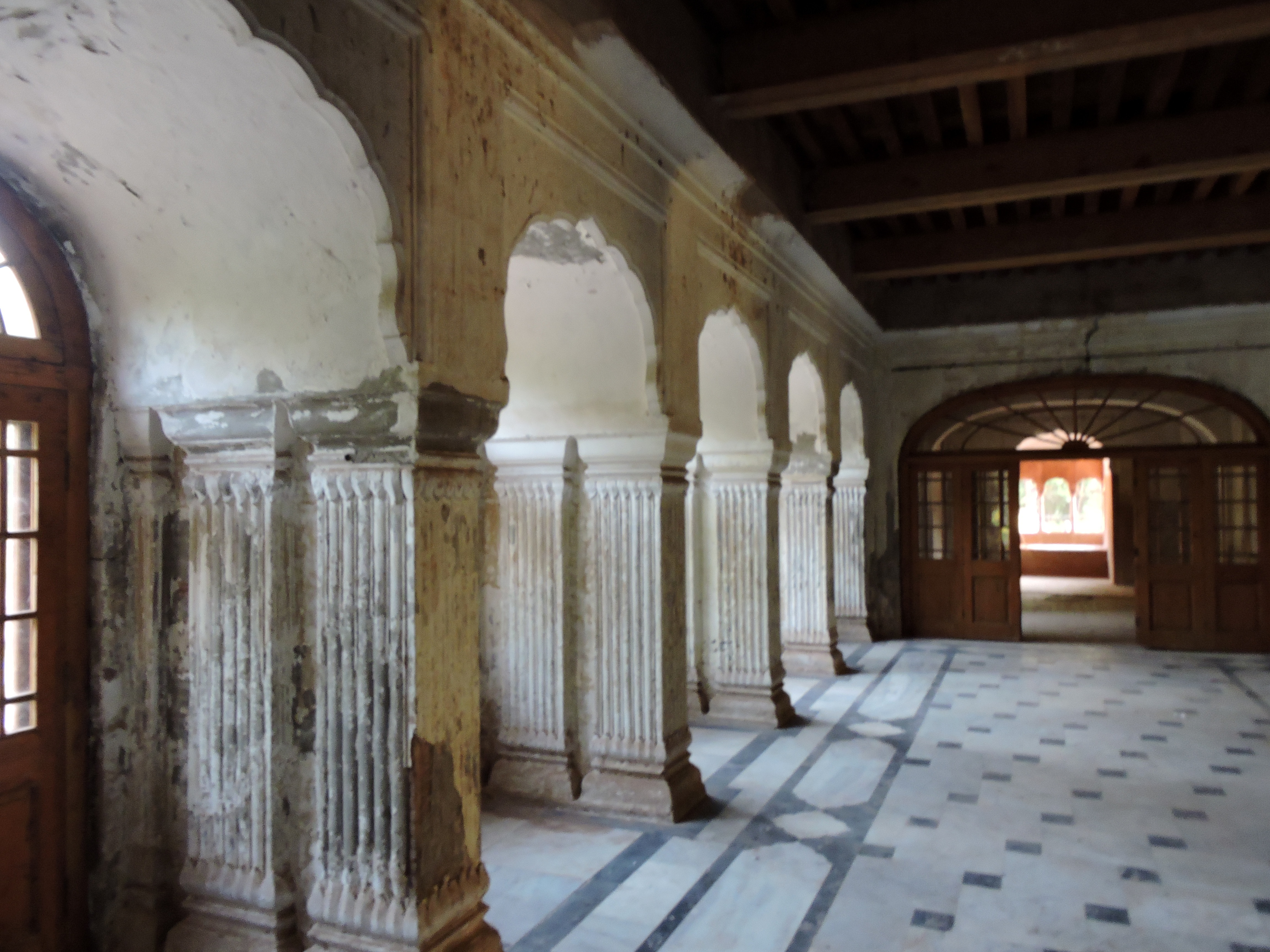
Hallway.

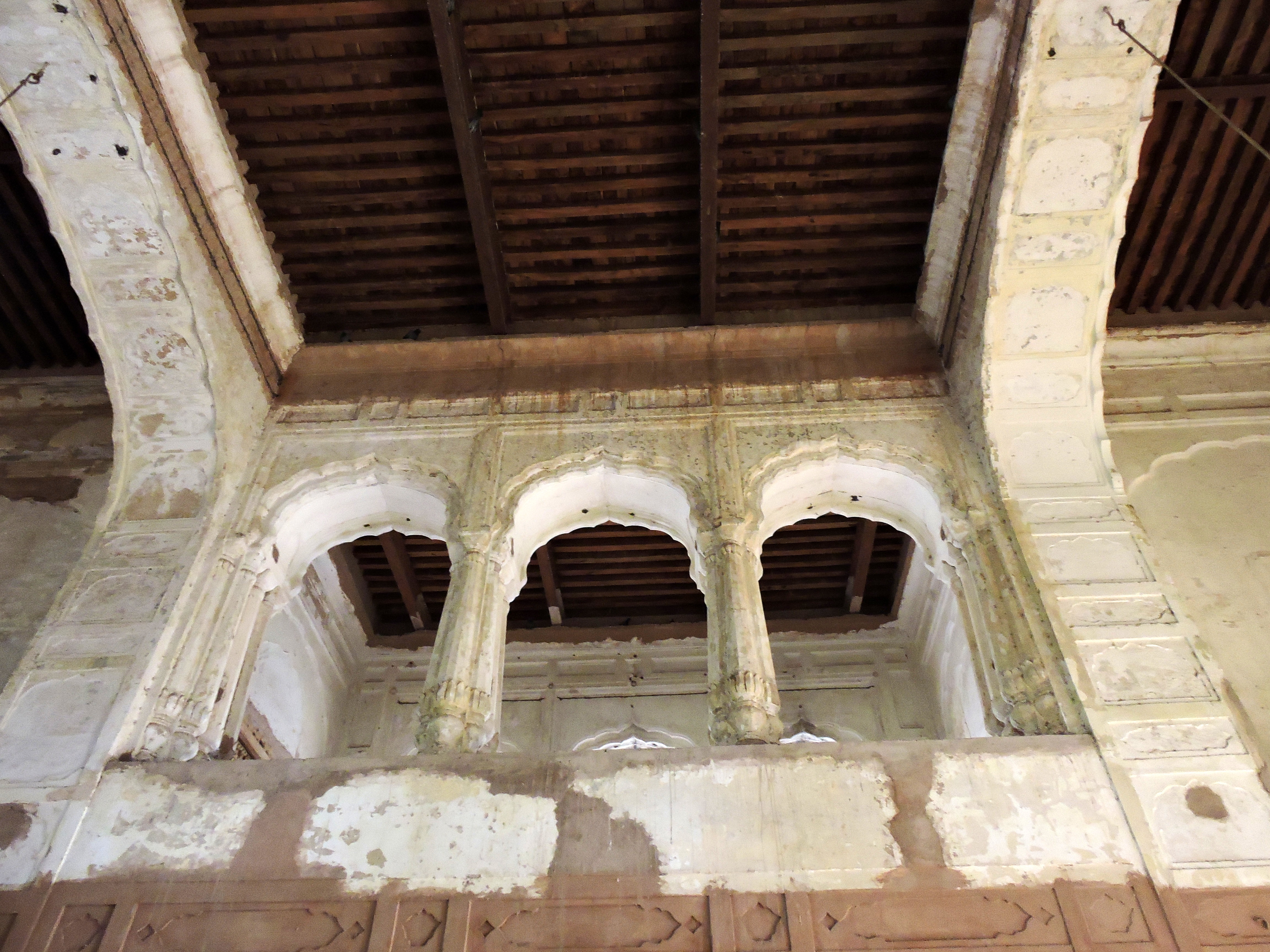
Interior design.

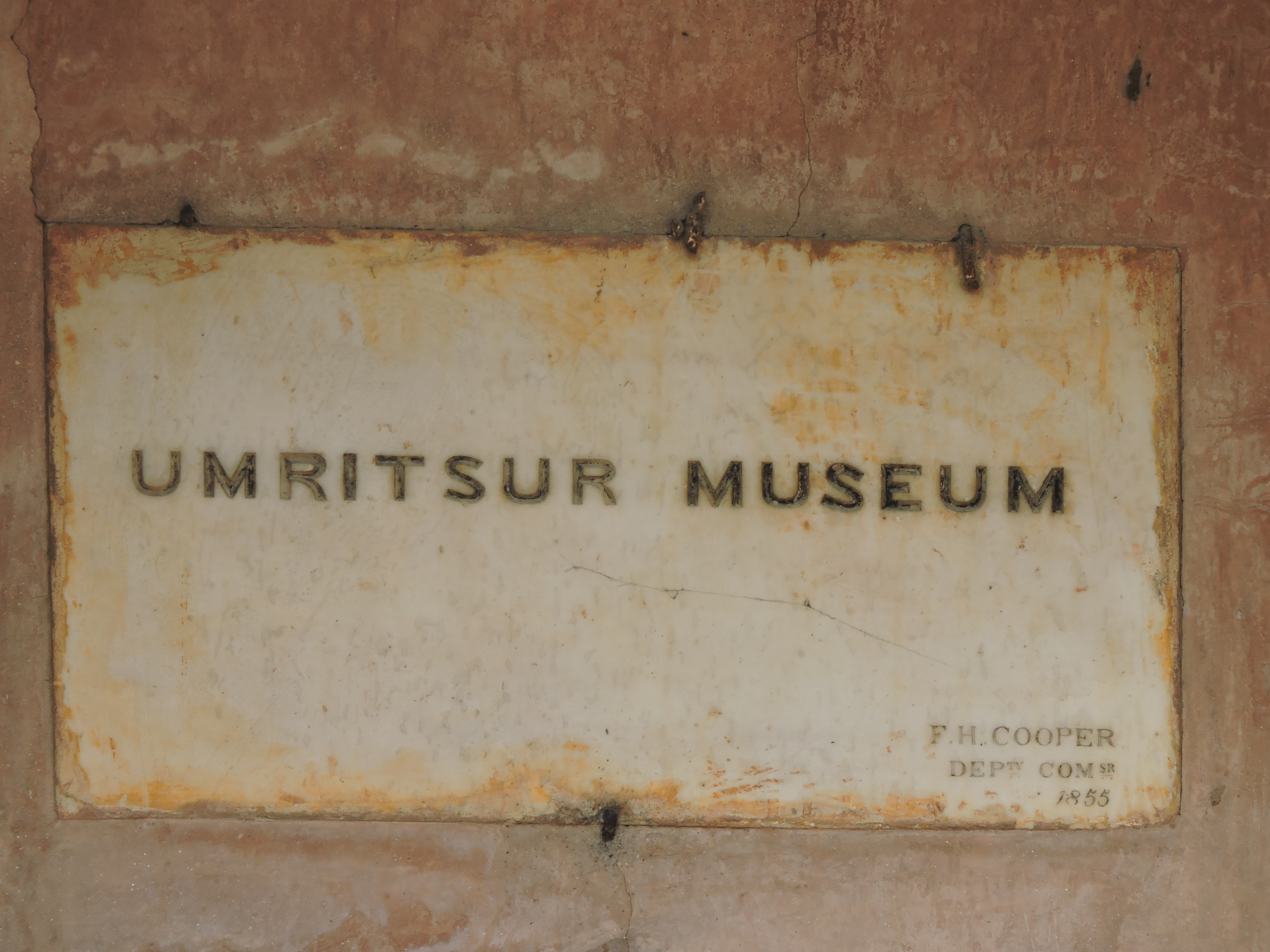
museum
