= Shamsher Bahadur Singh =

Indian poet (1911–1993)

Shamser Bahadur Singh
- Born: 13 January 1911; Ailum, Muzaffarnagar, United Provinces of Agra and Oudh, India
- Died: 12 May 1993 (aged 82)
- Occupations: Writer; poet
- Known for: Chuka Bhi Hun Nahin Main
- Awards: Sahitya Akademi

Shamsher Bahadur Singh (13 January 1911 – 12 May 1993) was an Indian poet, writer and pillar of the progressive trilogy of modern Hindi poetry. Shamsher, the creator of unique masculine images in Hindi poetry, was associated with the progressive ideology of life. Singh won the Sahitya Akademi in 1977 for Chuka Bhi Hun Nahin Main.

== Biography ==
Shamsher Bahadur Singh was born on 13 January 1911 in village Ailum, Muzaffarnagar, Uttar Pradesh. This village is now under Shamli district, after Shamli considered as a separate district in 2011. Due to his father's job, his education was started from Dehradun. Singh died on 12 May 1993 in Ahmedabad. In 1977, he was awarded the Sahitya Akademi Award for Chuka Bhi Hun Nahin Main.
