= Tomb of Shamsher Khan (Batala) =

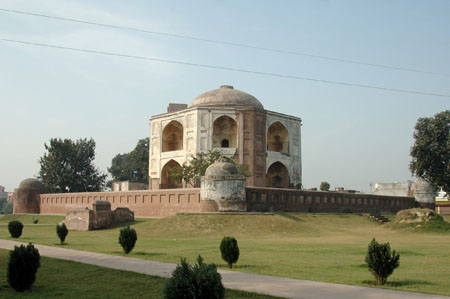
- Interactive map of Tomb of Shamsher Khan
- Location: Batala, Punjab, India
- Coordinates: 31°48′43.7″N 75°12′48.2″E
- Built: c. 1589–90
- Architectural style: Mughal

Monument of National Importance
- Official name: Shamsher Khan's tomb
- Reference no.: N-PB-7

Tomb of Shamsher Khan is a mausoleum and historic site located in Batala, in the Indian state of Punjab. Built during the 16th century, it is an example of Mughal architecture. Situated upon a raised platform, the tomb is octagonal in plan, with each side featuring two rows of recessed arches. It is surmounted by a low dome. It is listed as a monument of national importance.

== Background ==
An inscription, carved near the entrance of the southern tomb, states that Shamsher Khan had built a reservoir, a mosque, and a garden in Batala in 1589–90, during the reign of Akbar. While there is no mention of the tomb, it was presumably constructed around the same time.

Not much is known about the identity of Shamsher Khan. The only contemporary source in which the name appears is the Muntakhab-ut-Tawarikh, where it is noted that he was an eunuch who served as the superintendent of the exchequer in 1577–78. Later sources variously describe him as a foster brother of Akbar, or as a Rajput. However, the inscription of the tomb does not identify him as so.

== Description ==
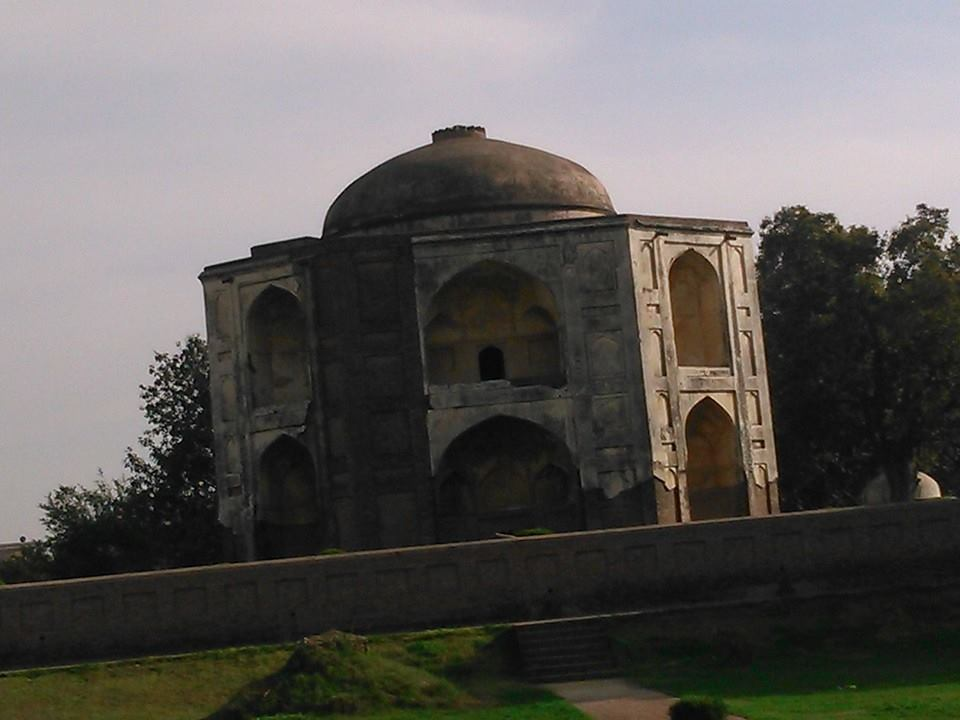
Tomb of Shamsher Khan

The tomb is an example of Mughal architecture. It is situated on a platform, measuring 34 × 39 meters. At each corer of the platform, a circular turret is provided, crowned with a small dome. A low wall runs around it, with a mihrab (prayer-niche) carved into its western side. The platform is accessible through an entrance at the southern side.

The plan of the mausoleum is an irregular octagonal, with sides that alternate in length. Each side of the facade features two stories of niches formed by pointed arches. The smaller sides, measuring 6 meters in length, have semi-octagonal niches, while rectangular niches are found on the larger sides which measure about 8.3 meters in length. The larger sides correspond with the cardinal directions. The spandrels of the arches are decorated with Arabesque designs, and each arch is flanked by two rows of panels on either side.

A parapet runs along the top of the building, with its height including the parapet being 10.4 meters. It is surmounted by a dome, resting upon a drum about 1.6 meters tall. The entrance to the tomb is from the south, and features the tomb's inscription, carved into red sandstone. The interior is a regular octagon, with each side measuring about 3 meters. The interior as well as the exterior of the mausoleum contained painted floral, geometric, and calligraphic designs. However, while the decoration on the interior has survived, only traces of it remain on the exterior. A pattern of swastikas runs along the base of the soffit of the dome.
