= List of villages in Kapurthala district =

Kapurthala district in Punjab, India is made up of four subdistricts and has a total of 626 villages. The subdistricts are: Bhulath, which has 100 villages, Kapurthala, which has 245 villages, Phagwara, which has 106 villages, and Sultanpur Lodhi, which has 181 villages. The following is a list of villages grouped by subdistrict.

== Bhulath ==
1. Akala
2. Akbarpur
3. Awan
4. Bagwanpur
5. Bagrian
6. Bajaj
7. Bakarpur
8. Ballo Chak
9. Baryar
10. Bassi
11. Bhadas
12. Bhagwanpur
13. Bhakuwal
14. Bhatnura Kalan
15. Bhatnura Khurd
16. Billpur
17. Boparai
18. Bulewal
19. Chak Shah Kala
20. Chakshah Alladin
21. Chogawan
22. Dabulian
23. Dala
24. Daulowal
25. Dhakran
26. Fatehgarh Sikri
27. Fatehpur
28. Feroz Sangowal
29. Habibwal
30. Hassuwal
31. Husewal
32. Hussainpur
33. Ibrahimwal Tarf Arshad Khan
34. Inowal
35. Isbucha
36. Jabbowal
37. Jaid
38. Kaluwal
39. Kamalpur
40. kamrai
41. Karnail Ganj
42. Khalil
43. Khassan
44. Lamman
45. Lit
46. Mana Talwandi
47. Mand Ahmedwala
48. Mand Allahabad
49. Mand Dograwala
50. Mand Faridkot
51. Mand Gurdaspur
52. Mand Ibrahimwal Tarf Arshad Khan
53. Mand Kulla
54. Mand Miani Jhadduwala
55. Mand Raipur Araian
56. Mand Sandhi Khanwala
57. Mand Sardar Sahibwala
58. Mand Talwandi Kuka
59. Mandi Road
60. Maqsudpur
61. Mehmadpur
62. Metlan Khairabad
63. Miani Bhagu Purian
64. Miranpur
65. Mubarakpur
66. Musa Khail
67. Nadala
68. Nadali
69. Nangal Lubana
70. Naurangpur
71. Pandori
72. Passiewal
73. Raipur Araian
74. Raipur Peerbakhshwala
75. Raipur Rajputan
76. Ramgarh
77. Rawan
78. Saitpur
79. Sarupwal
80. Shadipur
81. Sher Singhwala
82. Sheruwal
83. Sidhwan Bet
84. Surak
85. Talwandi Koka
86. Talwandi Purdil
87. Talwara
88. Tandi

== Kapurthala ==
1. Adnawali
2. Ahmadpur
3. Akbarpur
4. Alamgir
5. Alaudi
6. Alaudinpur
7. Alipur
8. Araianwala
9. Aujla Banwali
10. Aujla Jogi
11. Ayya
12. Badshahpur
13. Badyal
14. Bajola
15. Balehar Kalan
16. Balehar Khanpur
17. Bamuwal
18. Bana Malwala
19. Banwalipur
20. Basti Gobindpur
21. Batala
22. Behlolpur
23. Beja
24. Bhaguwal
25. Bhagwanpur
26. Bhaini
27. Bhait
28. Bhalaipur
29. Bhana
30. Bhandal Bet
31. Bhandal Dona
32. Bhano Langa
33. Bhawanipur
34. Bhila
35. Bhooi
36. Bhullar
37. Bibri
38. Biharipur
39. Bijli Nangal
40. Bishanpur
41. Boot
42. Boparai
43. Brindpur
44. Budha Theh
45. Budhuwala
46. Budo Punder
47. Buh
48. Burewal
49. Chak
50. Chak Gajiwal
51. Chak Gopipur
52. Chakoki
53. Chuharwal
54. Daburji
55. Dainwind
56. Daudpur
57. Daulatpur
58. Daulo Araian
59. Desal
60. Dewlanwala
61. Dhabulian
62. Dhaliwal Bet
63. Dhaliwal Dona
64. Dham
65. Dhandal
66. Dhapai
67. Dhawankhan Jagir
68. Dhawankhan Nishan
69. Dhudianwala
70. Dialpur
71. Dulowal
72. Fatehpur
73. Fattu Chak
74. Fattu Dhinga
75. Fazlabad
76. Gaji Gudana
77. Gaunspur
78. Gaunswala
79. Gaura
80. Ghaniaki
81. Ghug
82. Ghuluwal
83. Gobindpur
84. Gokalpur
85. Gopipur
86. Gosal
87. Gudani
88. Gurmukh Singhwala
89. Haibatpur
90. Hambowal
91. Hamira
92. Hothian
93. Hussainabad
94. Ibban
95. Isharwal
96. Jag
97. Jahangirpur
98. Jai Rampur
99. Jai Rampur
100. Jalal Bholana
101. Jalo Bhati
102. Jalowal
103. Jatike
104. Jawalapur
105. Jhal Bibri
106. Jhal Thikriwala
107. Jhugian Gulam
108. Kadrabad
109. Kadupur
110. Kahlwan
111. Kahna
112. Kalasanghia
113. Kamewal
114. Kanjli
115. Kapurthala (Rural)
116. Karahal Kalan
117. Karahal Khurd
118. Karahal Nauabad
119. Kasso Chahal
120. Kaulo Talwandi
121. Kesarpur
122. Khalu
123. Khangah
124. Khanowal
125. Khanpur
126. Khera Bet
127. Khera Dona
128. Khiranwali
129. Khojewali
130. Khukhrain
131. Khusropur
132. Kishan Singhwala
133. Kokalpur
134. Kolianwala
135. Kot Karar Khan
136. Kotli
137. Kutabpur
138. Lakhan Kalan
139. Lakhan Khurd
140. Lakhanke Padde
141. Lodhi Bholana
142. Mander Bet
143. Machhipal
144. Madho Jhanda
145. Madhopur
146. Mainwan
147. Majahadpur
148. Majorwala
149. Maksudpur
150. Malian
151. Manan
152. Mand Bhandal Bet
153. Mand Rampur
154. Mand Dhaliwal
155. Mand Sangojla
156. Mand Surakhpur
157. Mander Dona
158. Mangaroda
159. Mangewal
160. Mansurwal Bet
161. Mansurwal Dona
162. Miani Bola
163. Mirzapur
164. Mitha
165. Mithra
166. Mohmadwala
167. Moklanwala
168. Mudowal
169. Mugal Chak
170. Mundi
171. Muradpur Bet
172. Muradpur Dona
173. Murar
174. Mustafabad
175. Nabi Bakhshwala
176. Nangal Naraingarh
177. Narket
178. Nathu Chahal
179. Nawanpind
180. Nazampur
181. Nidoki
182. Nihalgarh
183. Nihaluwal
184. Nurpur Dona
185. Nurpur Januhan
186. Nurpur Jattan
187. Nurpur Khiranwali
188. Nurpur Lubhana
189. Nurpur Rajputan
190. Padda
191. Paharipur
192. Pakhowal
193. Parveznagar
194. Passan
195. Peerewal
196. Phiali
197. Phulewal
198. Qualpur
199. Rajpur
200. Ramidi
201. Rampur
202. Randhawa
203. Rasulpur Brahmanan
204. Rasulpur Chisty
205. Rasulpur Kulian
206. Ratra
207. Ratta Kadim
208. Ratta Nauabad
209. Rawal
210. Razapur
211. Rupanpur
212. Saido Bholana
213. Saidowal
214. Saiflabad
215. Samailpur
216. Sandhar Jagir
217. Sandhu Chatha
218. Sangojla
219. Sangowal
220. Sangrai
221. Seenpur
222. Shahpur Dogran
223. Shahpur Pira
224. Sheikhanwala
225. Sheikhupur
226. Sial
227. Sidhpur
228. Sidhwan Dona
229. Subhanpur
230. Sukhani
231. Sukhia Nangal
232. Sunranwala
233. Surkhpur
234. Tajpur
235. Talwandi Bakha
236. Talwandi Mehma
237. Talwandi Pain
238. Talwandi Rajputan
239. Tibba
240. Tarkhanawali
241. Tayabpur
242. Theh Kanjla
243. Thigli
244. Thikriwala
245. Toganwala
246. Ucha
247. Wadala Kalan
248. Wadala Khurd
249. Waryah Dona

== Phagwara ==
1. Akalgarh
2. Atholi
3. Babeli
4. Balaloan
5. Balrampur
6. Barn
7. Bazidwal
8. Bhabiana
9. Baghana
10. Bhagana
11. Bhagwan Pur
12. Bhakhriana
13. Bhanoki
14. Bhullarai
15. Bir Dhadoli/Dhadoli
16. Bir Khurampur
17. Bir Puadh
18. Bishanpur
19. Bohani
20. Brahampur
21. Chachoki
22. Chaheru
23. Chair
24. Chak Hakim
25. Chak Prema
26. Dewa Singhwala
27. Dhadday
28. Dhak Balaloan
29. Dhak Barn
30. Dhak Bhulla Rai
31. Dhak Chachoki
32. Dhak Chair
33. Dhak Jagpalpur
34. Dhak Khalwara
35. Dhak Khati
36. Dhak Khurampur
37. Dhak Malikpur
38. Dhak Manak
39. Dhak Narang Shah Pur
40. Dhak Pandori
41. Dhak Plahi
42. Dhandoli
43. Domeli
44. Drawesh Pind
45. Dug,
46. Fatehgarh
47. Gandhwan
48. Gujratan
49. Gulabgarh
50. Gulabgarh Jattan
51. Hajipur
52. Harbanspur
53. Hradaspur
54. Jagatpur Jattan
55. Jagpalpur
56. Jamalpur
57. Khajurla
58. Khalwara
59. Khangura
60. Khatti
61. Khera
62. Khuni Kiar
63. Khurampur
64. Kirpalpur
65. Kishan Pur
66. Kot Puransingh
67. Lakhpur
68. Madhopur
69. Maheru
70. Maio Patti
71. Malikhpur
72. Man
73. Manak
74. Mauli
75. Mehat
76. Miranpur
77. Nangal
78. Nangal Maja
79. Narang Shahpur
80. Narangpur
81. Naroor
82. Nasirabad
83. Nihalgarh
84. Panchhat
85. Pandori
86. Parwa
87. Phagwara Sharki
88. Plahi
89. Prempur
90. Rampur Khalian
91. Rampur Sunran
92. Randhirgarh
93. Ranipur Kamboan
94. Ranipur Rajputan
95. Rawalpindi
96. Rehana Jattan
97. Sahni
98. Sangatpur
99. Saprore
100. Sikri
101. Sri Hargobindgarh
102. Sunran Rajputan
103. Tanda Bhagana
104. Tanda Naroor
105. Thakar Ki
106. Ucha Pind
107. Wahid
108. Wariah

== Sultanpur Lodhi ==
1. Ahli Kalan
2. Ahli Khurd
3. Ahmadpur
4. Akalpur
5. Alahdad Chak
6. Alam Khanwala
7. Allahditta
8. Alluwal
9. Amanipur
10. Amarjitpur
11. Amritpur
12. Baja
13. Baoopur Jadid
14. Baoopur Kadim
15. Bhago Arain
16. Bhagobudha
17. Bhaini Bahadur
18. Bhaini Husekhan
19. Bhaini Kadar Bakhash
20. Bharoana
21. Bhour
22. Bhim Kadim
23. Bhim Jadidaaa
24. Bidhipur
25. Boolpur
26. Burewal
27. Busowal
28. Chakkotla
29. Chananwindi
30. Chaudhriwal
31. Chhanna Sher Singh
32. Choladha
33. Chuharpur
34. Dadwindi
35. Dalla
36. Dandupur
37. Dariewal
38. Daula
39. Depewal
40. Derasaidan
41. Dewa Singhwala
42. Doda Kamman
43. Doda Sodagar
44. Dodawazir
45. Farid Sarai
46. Faridpur
47. Fattowal
48. Gajipur
49. Gamewal
50. Gill
51. Gobindgarh
52. Gudda
53. Haibatpur
54. Haidrabad Bet
55. Haidrabad Dona
56. Hazara
57. Hazipur
58. Hussainpur Bulle
59. Hussainpur Dulowal
60. Jabbowal
61. Jabbo Sudhar
62. Jainpur
63. Jeorgepur Urf Merry Pur
64. Jhalleiwala
65. Jhanduwala Kamboan
66. Jhugian Bandu
67. Jhugian Gamun
68. Kabirpur
69. Kalru
70. Kalubhatia
71. Kamalpur
72. Karamjitpur
73. Khijarpur
74. Khokhar Kadim Jadid
75. Khurd
76. Kishanpur Ghurka
77. Kutbewala
78. Ladwal
79. Lakh Waryah
80. Latianwala
81. Lau
82. Lodhiwal
83. Machhi Jowa
84. Mahablipur
85. Mahijitpur
86. Mand Ahli Kalan
87. Mand Bandu Jadid
88. Mand Bandu Kadim
89. Mand Bhim Kadim
90. Mand Dhun
91. Mand Dhunda
92. Mand Gujarpur
93. Mand Hazara
94. Mand Hussainpur Bulle
95. Mand Indresa
96. Mand Mubarakpur
97. Mand Partappur
98. Mandi Alluwal
99. Mandi Kabirpur Jadid
100. Mandi Kabirpur Kadim
101. Mangoopur
102. Maniala
103. Masit
104. Mewa Singhwala
105. Miani Bahadur
106. Midewal
107. Mienwal
108. Mira
109. Miranpur
110. Mirzapur
111. Mohamadabad
112. Mokha
113. Muhamadali Khanwala
114. Muketramwala
115. Mullan Baha
116. Mullan Kala
117. Mundi
118. Nabipur
119. Nand Inderpur
120. Nasirewal
121. Nasirpur
122. Nathupur
123. Nurowal
124. Paman
125. Pandori Jagir
126. Paramjitpur
127. Passan Kadim
128. Patti Bakarpur
129. Patti Bhalu Bahadur
130. Patti Safdarpur
131. Patti Sardar Nabi Bakhash
132. Pitho Rahal
133. Raman
134. Ramgarh Daleli
135. Rampur Gaura
136. Rampur Jagir
137. Randhirpur
138. Rawal
139. Sabuwal
140. Safdarpur
141. Salehpur
142. Saidpur
143. Salehpur Dona
144. Sangra
145. Sarai Jattan
146. Sarupwal
147. Sawal
148. Sech
149. Shahdullahpur
150. Shahjahanpur
151. Shahwala Indresa
152. Shahwala Nakki
153. Shatabgarh
154. Sheikh Manga
155. Sherpur dogran
156. Sherpur Dona
157. Sherpur Sadha
158. Shikarpur
159. Shiv Dayalwala
160. Silla
161. Suchetgarh
162. Sujo Kalia
163. Sultanpur (Rural)
164. Takia
165. Talwandi Chaudhrian
166. Tarf Behbal Bahadur
167. Tarf Hazi
168. Tashpur
169. Thakar Kaura
170. Thatta
171. Tibba
172. Tibbi
173. Todarwal
174. Toti
175. Ucha
176. Ugrupur
177. Wadhel Harnampur
178. Wadhel Kadim
179. Wadhel Khuda Bakhashwala
180. Wadhel Mauja
181. Waryah
182. Watanwali
