= Fattu Chak =

- Village
- Location in Punjab, India Fattu Chak (India)
- Coordinates: 31.495150°N 75.339760°E
- Country: India
- State: Punjab
- District: Kapurthala

Government
  - Type: Panchayati raj (India)
  - Body: Gram panchayat

Population (2011)
  - Total: 783
- Sex ratio 407/376♂/♀

Languages
  - Official: Punjabi
  - Other spoken: Hindi
- Time zone: UTC+5:30 (IST)
- PIN: 144804
- Telephone code: 01822
- ISO 3166 code: IN-PB
- Vehicle registration: PB-09
- Website: kapurthala.gov.in

Fattu Chak is a village in Kapurthala district of Punjab State, India. It is located 20 kilometres (12 mi) from Kapurthala, which is both district and sub-district headquarters of Fattu Chak. The village is administrated by a Sarpanch, who is an elected representative.

== Demography ==
According to the report published by Census India in 2011, Fattu Chak has a total number of 171 houses and population of 783 of which include 407 males and 376 females. Literacy rate of Fattu Chak is 74.44%, lower than state average of 75.84%. The population of children under the age of 6 years is 71 which is 9.07% of total population of Fattu Chak, and child sex ratio is approximately 821, lower than state average of 846.

As per census 2011, 248 people were engaged in work activities out of the total population of Fattu Chak which includes 219 males and 29 females. According to census survey report 2011, 96.37% workers describe their work as main work and 3.63% workers are involved in Marginal activity providing livelihood for less than 6 months.

== Caste ==
The village has schedule caste (SC) constitutes 53.51% of total population of the village and it doesn't have any Schedule Tribe (ST) population.

== Population data ==
Particulars	Total	Male	Female
Total No. of Houses	171	-	-
Population	783	407	376
Child (0-6)	71	39	32
Schedule Caste	419	213	206
Schedule Tribe	0	0	0
Literacy	74.44 %	77.45 %	71.22 %
Total Workers	248	219	29
Main Worker	239	0	0
Marginal Worker	9	7	2

== See also ==
- List of villages in Kapurthala
