= Gaunspur =

- Village
- Location in Punjab, India Gaunspur (India)
- Coordinates: 31.879894°N 75.630629°E
- Country: India
- State: Punjab
- District: Kapurthala

Government
  - Type: Panchayati raj (India)
  - Body: Gram panchayat

Population (2011)
  - Total: 43
- Sex ratio 14/29♂/♀

Languages
  - Official: Punjabi
  - Other spoken: Hindi
- Time zone: UTC+5:30 (IST)
- PIN: 144625
- Telephone code: 01822
- ISO 3166 code: IN-PB
- Vehicle registration: PB-09
- Website: kapurthala.gov.in

Gaunspur is a village in Kapurthala district of Punjab State, India. It is located 19 kilometres (12 mi) from Kapurthala, which is both district and sub-district headquarters of Gaunspur. The village is administrated by a Sarpanch, who is an elected representative.

== Demography ==
According to the report published by Census India in 2011, Gaunspur has a total number of 8 houses and population of 43 of which include 14 males and 29 females. Literacy rate of Gaunspur is 86.49%, higher than state average of 75.84%. The population of children under the age of 6 years is 6 which is 13.95% of total population of Gaunspur, and child sex ratio is approximately 5000, higher than state average of 846.

== Population data ==
Particulars	Total	Male	Female
Total No. of Houses	8	-	-
Population	43	14	29
Child (0-6)	6	1	5
Schedule Caste	0	0	0
Schedule Tribe	0	0	0
Literacy	86.49 %	84.62 %	87.50 %
Total Workers	9	9	0
Main Worker	5	0	0
Marginal Worker	4	4	0

== Air travel connectivity ==
The closest airport to the village is Sri Guru Ram Dass Jee International Airport.
