= Talwandi Pain =

- Village
- Location in Punjab, India Talwandi Pain (India)
- Coordinates: 31.282762°N 75.279988°E
- Country: India
- State: Punjab
- District: Kapurthala

Government
  - Type: Panchayati raj (India)
  - Body: Gram panchayat

Population (2011)
  - Total: 630
- Sex ratio 334/296♂/♀

Languages
  - Official: Punjabi
  - Other spoken: Hindi
- Time zone: UTC+5:30 (IST)
- PIN: 144625
- Telephone code: 01822
- ISO 3166 code: IN-PB
- Vehicle registration: PB-09
- Website: kapurthala.gov.in

Talwandi Pain is a village in Kapurthala district of Punjab State, India. It is located 19 kilometres (12 mi) from Kapurthala, which is both district and sub-district headquarters of Talwandi Pain. The village is administrated by a Sarpanch, who is an elected representative.

== Demography ==
According to the report published by Census India in 2011, Talwandi Pain has 117 houses with total population of 630 persons of which 334 are male and 296 females. Literacy rate of Talwandi Pain is 76.43%, higher than the state average of 75.84%. The population of children in the age group 0–6 years is 53 which is 8.41% of total population. Child sex ratio is approximately 828, lower than the state average of 846.

== Population data ==
Particulars	Total	Male	Female
Total No. of Houses	117	-	-
Total Population	630	334	296
In the age group 0–6 years	53	29	24
Scheduled Castes (SC)	358	184	174
Scheduled Tribes (ST)	0	0	0
Literates	441	242	199
Illiterate	189	92	97
Total Worker	191	165	26
Main Worker	177	158	19
Marginal Worker	14	7	7
