= Khurampur, Phagwara =

Khurampur
- Village
- Location in Punjab, India Khurampur (India)
- Coordinates: 31.257246°N 75.775303°E
- Country: India
- State: Punjab
- District: Kapurthala

Government
  - Type: Panchayati raj (India)
  - Body: Gram panchayat

Population (2011)
  - Total: 1,041
- Sex ratio 493/548♂/♀

Languages
  - Official: Punjabi
  - Other spoken: Hindi
- Time zone: UTC+5:30 (IST)
- PIN: 144401
- Telephone code: 01822
- ISO 3166 code: IN-PB
- Vehicle registration: PB-09
- Website: kapurthala.gov.in

Khurampur is a village in Tehsil Phagwara, Kapurthala district, in Punjab, India. It is located 12 kilometres (7.5 mi) away from sub-district headquarter Phagwara and 46 km away from district headquarter Kapurthala and 129 kilometres (80 mi)from State capital Chandigarh. The village is administrated by a Sarpanch, who is an elected representative.

== Transport ==
Phagwara Junction Railway Station, Mauli Halt Railway Station are the nearby railway stations to Khurampur. Jalandhar City railway station is 23 km away from the village. The village is 118 km away from Sri Guru Ram Dass Jee International Airport in Amritsar. Another nearby airport is Sahnewal Airport in Ludhiana which is located 40 km away from the village.
