= Kadupur =

- Village
- Location in Punjab, India Kadupur (India)
- Coordinates: 31.390725°N 75.408979°E
- Country: India
- State: Punjab
- District: Kapurthala

Government
  - Type: Panchayati raj (India)
  - Body: Gram panchayat

Population (2011)
  - Total: 1,068
- Sex ratio 553/515♂/♀

Languages
  - Official: Punjabi
  - Other spoken: Hindi
- Time zone: UTC+5:30 (IST)
- PIN: 144601
- Telephone code: 01822
- ISO 3166 code: IN-PB
- Vehicle registration: PB-09
- Website: kapurthala.gov.in

Kadupur is a village in Kapurthala district of Punjab State, India. It is located 3 kilometres (1.9 mi) from Kapurthala, which is both district and sub-district headquarters of Kadupur. The village is administrated by a Sarpanch who is an elected representative of village as per the constitution of India and Panchayati raj (India).

== Demography ==
According to the report published by Census India in 2011, Kadupur has 219 houses with the total population of 1,068 persons of which 553 are male and 515 females. Literacy rate of Kadupur is 70.90%, lower than the state average of 75.84%. The population of children in the age group 0–6 years is 147 which is 13.76% of the total population. Child sex ratio is approximately 909, higher than the state average of 846.

== Population data ==
Particulars	Total	Male	Female
Total No. of Houses	219	-	-
Population	1,068	553	515
Child (0-6)	147	77	70
Schedule Caste	582	301	281
Schedule Tribe	0	0	0
Literacy	70.90 %	78.36 %	62.92 %
Total Workers	424	308	116
Main Worker	409	0	0
Marginal Worker	15	12	3
