= Gosal, Kapurthala =

Gosal
- Village
- Location in Punjab, India Gosal (India)
- Coordinates: 31.170804°N 75.977528°E
- Country: India
- State: Punjab
- District: Kapurthala

Government
  - Type: Panchayati raj (India)
  - Body: Gram panchayat

Population (2011)
  - Total: 451
- Sex ratio 240/211♂/♀

Languages
  - Official: Punjabi
  - Other spoken: Hindi
- Time zone: UTC+5:30 (IST)
- PIN: 144620
- Telephone code: 01822
- ISO 3166 code: IN-PB
- Vehicle registration: PB-09
- Website: kapurthala.gov.in

Gosal is a village in Kapurthala district of Punjab State, India. It is located 10 kilometres (6.2 mi) from Kapurthala, which is both district and sub-district headquarters of Gosal. The village is administrated by a Sarpanch who is an elected representative of village as per the constitution of India and Panchayati raj (India).

== Demography ==
According to the report published by Census India in 2011, Gosal has total number of 96 houses and a population of 451 of which 240 are males and 211 are females. The literacy rate of Gosal is 79.86%, higher than state average of 75.84%. The population of children under the age of 6 years is 34 which is 7.54% of the total population of Gosal, and the child sex ratio is approximately 700, lower than the state average of 846.

== Population data ==
| Particulars | Total | Male | Female |
|---|---|---|---|
| Total No. of Houses | 96 | - | - |
| Population | 451 | 240 | 211 |
| Child (0–6) | 34 | 20 | 14 |
| Schedule Caste | 17 | 8 | 9 |
| Schedule Tribe | 0 | 0 | 0 |
| Literacy | 79.86% | 86.82% | 72.08% |
| Total Workers | 162 | 143 | 19 |
| Main Worker | 158 | 0 | 0 |
| Marginal Worker | 4 | 3 | 1 |

== Air travel connectivity ==
The closest airport to the village is Sri Guru Ram Dass Jee International Airport.
