= Ranipur Rajputan =

- Village
- Location in Punjab, India Ranipur Rajputan (India)
- Coordinates: 31.299475°N 75.742964°E
- Country: India
- State: Punjab
- District: Kapurthala

Government
  - Type: Panchayati raj (India)
  - Body: Gram panchayat

Population (2011)
  - Total: 1,595
- Sex ratio 801/794♂/♀

Languages
  - Official: Punjabi
  - Other spoken: Hindi
- Time zone: UTC+5:30 (IST)
- PIN: 144401
- Telephone code: 01822
- ISO 3166 code: IN-PB
- Vehicle registration: PB-09
- Website: kapurthala.gov.in

Ranipur Rajputan is a village in Phagwara Tehsil in Kapurthala district of Punjab State, India. It is 48 kilometres (30 mi) from Kapurthala, 13 kilometres (8.1 mi) from Phagwara. The village is administrated by a Sarpanch who is an elected representative of village as per the constitution of India and Panchayati raj.

== Transport ==
Phagwara Junction Railway Station and Chiheru Railway Station are nearby railway stations to Ranipur Rajputan. Jalandhar City Railway station is 16 km from the village. The village is 110 km away from Sri Guru Ram Dass Jee International Airport in Amritsar. Another nearby airport is Sahnewal Airport in Ludhiana, 50 km from the village.
