= Dhak Narang Shah Pur =

- Village
- Location in Punjab, India Dhak Narang Shah Pur (India)
- Coordinates: 31.224726°N 75.735332°E
- Country: India
- State: Punjab
- District: Kapurthala

Government
  - Type: Panchayati raj (India)
  - Body: Gram panchayat

Population (2011)
  - Total: 671
- Sex ratio 341/330♂/♀

Languages
  - Official: Punjabi
  - Other spoken: Hindi
- Time zone: UTC+5:30 (IST)
- PIN: 144401
- Telephone code: 01824
- ISO 3166 code: IN-PB
- Vehicle registration: PB-09
- Website: kapurthala.gov.in

Dhak Narang Shah Pur is a village in Phagwara Tehsil in Kapurthala district of Punjab State, India. It is located 43 kilometres (27 mi) from Kapurthala, 3 kilometres (1.9 mi) from Phagwara. The village is administrated by a Sarpanch, who is an elected representative.

== Demography ==
According to the report published by Census India in 2011, Dhak Narang Shah Pur has 121 houses with the total population of 671 persons of which 341 are male and 330 females. Literacy rate of Dhak Narang Shah Pur is 85.43%, higher than the state average of 75.84%. The population of children in the age group 0–6 years is 74 which is 11.03% of the total population. Child sex ratio is approximately 947, higher than the state average of 846.

== Population data ==
Particulars	Total	Male	Female
Total No. of Houses	121	-	-
Population	671	341	330
Child (0-6)	74	38	36
Schedule Caste	603	309	294
Schedule Tribe	0	0	0
Literacy	85.43 %	90.43 %	80.27 %
Total Workers	222	216	6
Main Worker	221	0	0
Marginal Worker	1	0	1
