= Jhugian Gulam =

- Village
- Location in Punjab, India Jhugian Gulam (India)
- Coordinates: 31°21′42″N 75°19′37″E
- Country: India
- State: Punjab
- District: Kapurthala

Government
  - Type: Panchayati raj (India)
  - Body: Gram panchayat

Population (2011)
  - Total: 411
- Sex ratio 225/186♂/♀

Languages
  - Official: Punjabi
  - Other spoken: Hindi
- Time zone: UTC+5:30 (IST)
- PIN: 144601
- Telephone code: 01822
- ISO 3166 code: IN-PB
- Vehicle registration: PB-09
- Website: kapurthala.gov.in

Jhugian Gulam is a village in Kapurthala district of Punjab State, India. It is located 7 kilometres (4.3 mi) from Kapurthala, which is both district and sub-district headquarters of Jhugian Gulam. The village is administrated by a Sarpanch who is an elected representative.

== Demography ==
According to the 2011 Census of India., Jhugian Gulam has total number of 75 houses and population of 411 of which include 225 males and 186 females. Literacy rate of Jhugian Gulam is 70.19%, lower than state average of 75.84%. The population of children under the age of 6 years is 52 which is 12.65% of total population of Jhugian Gulam, and child sex ratio is approximately 486, lower than state average of 846.

== Population data ==
Particulars	Total	Male	Female
Total No. of Houses	75	-	-
Total Population	411	225	186
In the age group 0–6 years	52	35	17
Scheduled Castes (SC)	274	153	121
Scheduled Tribes (ST)	0	0	0
Literates	252	142	110
Illiterate	159	83	76
Total Worker	142	120	22
Main Worker	82	74	8
Marginal Worker	60	46	14

== Air travel connectivity ==
The closest airport to the village is Sri Guru Ram Dass Jee International Airport.
