= Sheikhanwala =

- Village
- Location in Punjab, India Sheikhanwala (India)
- Coordinates: 31.430164°N 75.267594°E
- Country: India
- State: Punjab
- District: Kapurthala

Government
  - Type: Panchayati raj (India)
  - Body: Gram panchayat

Population (2011)
  - Total: 399
- Sex ratio 210/189♂/♀

Languages
  - Official: Punjabi
  - Other spoken: Hindi
- Time zone: UTC+5:30 (IST)
- PIN: 144804
- Telephone code: 01822
- ISO 3166 code: IN-PB
- Vehicle registration: PB-09
- Website: kapurthala.gov.in

Sheikhanwala is a village in Kapurthala district of Punjab State, India. It is located 15 kilometres (9.3 mi) from Kapurthala, which is both district and sub-district headquarters of Sheikhanwala. The village is administrated by a Sarpanch who is an elected representative of village as per the constitution of India and Panchayati raj (India).

== Demography ==
According to the report published by Census India in 2011, Sheikhanwala has 77 houses with total population of 399 persons of which 210 are male and 189 females. Literacy rate of Sheikhanwala is 75.35%, lower than the state average of 75.84%. The population of children in the age group 0–6 years is 46 which is 11.53% of total population. Child sex ratio is approximately 1091, higher than the state average of 846.

== Population data ==
Particulars	Total	Male	Female
Total No. of Houses	77	-	-
Population	399	210	189
Child (0-6)	46	22	24
Schedule Caste	263	139	124
Schedule Tribe	0	0	0
Literacy	75.35 %	80.85 %	69.09 %
Total Workers	136	129	7
Main Worker	131	0	0
Marginal Worker	5	5	0
