= Chak Gajiwal =

- Village
- Location in Punjab, India Chak Gajiwal (India)
- Coordinates: 31.399563°N 75.310606°E
- Country: India
- State: Punjab
- District: Kapurthala

Government
  - Type: Panchayati raj (India)
  - Body: Gram panchayat

Population (2011)
  - Total: 30
- Sex ratio 16/14♂/♀

Languages
  - Official: Punjabi
  - Other spoken: Hindi
- Time zone: UTC+5:30 (IST)
- PIN: 144601
- Telephone code: 01822
- ISO 3166 code: IN-PB
- Vehicle registration: PB-09
- Website: kapurthala.gov.in

Chak Gajiwal is a village in Kapurthala district of Punjab State, India. It is located 10 kilometres (6.2 mi) from Kapurthala, which is both district and sub-district headquarters of Chak Gajiwal. The village is administrated by a Sarpanch, who is an elected representative.

== Demography ==
According to the report published by Census India in 2011, Chak Gajiwal has a total number of 6 houses and population of 30 of which include 16 males and 14 females. Literacy rate of Chak Gajiwal is 85.19%, higher than state average of 75.84%. The population of children under the age of 6 years is 3 which is 10.00% of total population of Chak Gajiwal, and child sex ratio is approximately 0, lower than state average of 846.

== Population data ==
Particulars	Total	Male	Female
Total No. of Houses	6	-	-
Population	30	16	14
Child (0-6)	3	0	3
Schedule Caste	0	0	0
Schedule Tribe	0	0	0
Literacy	85.19 %	87.50 %	81.82 %
Total Workers	9	7	2
Main Worker	8	0	0
Marginal Worker	1	0	1

== Air travel connectivity ==
The closest airport to the village is Sri Guru Ram Dass Jee International Airport.
