= Karahal Kalan =

- Village
- Location in Punjab, India Karahal Kalan (India)
- Coordinates: 31.285479°N 75.303317°E
- Country: India
- State: Punjab
- District: Kapurthala

Government
  - Type: Panchayati raj (India)
  - Body: Gram panchayat

Population (2011)
  - Total: 801
- Sex ratio 395/406♂/♀

Languages
  - Official: Punjabi
  - Other spoken: Hindi
- Time zone: UTC+5:30 (IST)
- PIN: 144625
- Telephone code: 01822
- ISO 3166 code: IN-PB
- Vehicle registration: PB-09
- Website: kapurthala.gov.in

Karahal Kalan is a village in Kapurthala district of Punjab State, India. Kalan is Persian language word which means Big.It is located 15 kilometres (9.3 mi) from Kapurthala, which is both district and sub-district headquarters of Karahal Kalan. The village is administrated by a Sarpanch, who is an elected representative.

== Demography ==
According to the report published by Census India in 2011, Karahal Kalan has 153 houses with the total population of 801, of which 395 are male and 406 females. The literacy rate of Karahal Kalan is 73.74%, lower than the state average of 75.84%. The population of children in the age group 0–6 years is 104, which is 12.98% of the total population. Child sex ratio is approximately 857, higher than the state average of 846.

== Population data ==
Particulars	Total	Male	Female
No. of Houses	153	-	-
Population	801	395	406
Child (0-6)	104	56	48
Schedule Caste	372	179	193
Schedule Tribe	0	0	0
Literacy	73.74 %	77.29 %	70.39 %
Total Workers	203	180	23
Main Worker	199	0	0
Marginal Worker	4	3	1
