= Sunranwala, Kapurthala =

Sunranwala
- Village
- Location in Punjab, India Sunranwala (India)
- Coordinates: 31.278177°N 75.421362°E
- Country: India
- State: Punjab
- District: Kapurthala

Government
  - Type: Panchayati raj (India)
  - Body: Gram panchayat

Population (2011)
  - Total: 572
- Sex ratio 287/285♂/♀

Languages
  - Official: Punjabi
  - Other spoken: Hindi
- Time zone: UTC+5:30 (IST)
- PIN: 144601
- Telephone code: 01822
- ISO 3166 code: IN-PB
- Vehicle registration: PB-09

Sunranwala is a village in Kapurthala district of Punjab State, India. It is also called Amrik walia sunnera. It is located 13 kilometres (8.1 mi) from Kapurthala, which is both district and sub-district headquarters of Sunranwala. The village is administrated by a Sarpanch who is an elected representative of village as per the constitution of India and Panchayati raj (India).

== Demography ==
According to the report published by Census India in 2011, Sunranwala has 128 houses with the total population of 572 persons of which 287 are male and 285 females. Literacy rate of Sunranwala is 78.34%, higher than the state average of 75.84%. The population of children in the age group 0–6 years is 55 which is 9.62% of the total population. Child sex ratio is approximately 964, higher than the state average of 846.

== Population data ==
| Particulars | Total | Male | Female |
|---|---|---|---|
| Total No. of Houses | 128 | - | - |
| Population | 572 | 287 | 285 |
| Child (0-6) | 55 | 28 | 27 |
| Schedule Caste | 26 | 11 | 15 |
| Schedule Tribe | 0 | 0 | 0 |
| Literacy | 78.34 % | 79.92 % | 76.74 % |
| Total Workers | 176 | 159 | 17 |
| Main Worker | 164 | 0 | 0 |
| Marginal Worker | 12 | 8 | 4 |
