= Dhabulian =

Dabulian
- Village
- Location in Punjab, India Dabulian (India)
- Coordinates: 31.366645°N 75.279988°E
- Country: India
- State: Punjab
- District: Kapurthala

Government
  - Type: Panchayati raj (India)
  - Body: Gram panchayat

Population (2011)
  - Total: 807
- Sex ratio 417/390♂/♀

Languages
  - Official: Punjabi
  - Other spoken: Hindi
- Time zone: UTC+5:30 (IST)
- PIN: 144601
- Telephone code: 01822
- ISO 3166 code: IN-PB
- Vehicle registration: PB-09
- Website: kapurthala.gov.in

Dabulian is a village in Kapurthala district of Punjab State, India. It is located 9 kilometres (5.6 mi) from Kapurthala, which is both district and sub-district headquarters of Dabulian. The village is administrated by a Sarpanch, who is an elected representative.

== Demography ==
According to the report published by Census India in 2011, Dhabulian has a total number of 148 houses and population of 807 of which include 417 males and 390 females. Literacy rate of Dhabulian is 74.80%, lower than state average of 75.84%. The population of children under the age of 6 years is 69 which is 8.55% of total population of Dhabulian, and child sex ratio is approximately 971, higher than state average of 846.

== Caste ==
The village has schedule caste (SC) constitutes 40.89% of total population of the village and it doesn't have any Schedule Tribe (ST) population,

== Population data ==
Particulars	Total	Male	Female
Total No. of Houses	148	-	-
Population	807	417	390
Child (0–6)	69	35	34
Schedule Caste	330	168	162
Schedule Tribe	0	0	0
Literacy	74.80 %	80.63 %	68.54 %
Total Workers	283	235	48
Main Worker	236	0	0
Marginal Worker	47	16	31

== Air travel connectivity ==
The closest airport to the village is Sri Guru Ram Dass Jee International Airport.
