= Surkhpur =

Surkhpur is a village located in Kapurthala district, Punjab, India, India. It is famous for kabaddi and has the best kabaddi players in the world. Village is about 5 km far from Beas River
