= Ibban =

- Village
- Location in Punjab, India Ibban (India)
- Coordinates: 31.340292°N 75.450495°E
- Country: India
- State: Punjab
- District: Kapurthala

Government
  - Type: Panchayati raj (India)
  - Body: Gram panchayat

Population (2011)
  - Total: 1,516
- Sex ratio 776/740♂/♀

Languages
  - Official: Punjabi
  - Other spoken: Hindi
- Time zone: UTC+5:30 (IST)
- PIN: 144601
- Telephone code: 01822
- ISO 3166 code: IN-PB
- Vehicle registration: PB-09
- Website: kapurthala.gov.in

Ibban is a village in Kapurthala district of Punjab State, India. It is located 10 kilometres (6.2 mi) from Kapurthala, which is both district and sub-district headquarters of Ibban. The village is administrated by a Sarpanch, who is an elected representative

== Demography ==
According to the report published by Census India in 2011, Ibban has total number of 325 houses and population of 1,516 of which include 776 males and 740 females. Literacy rate of Ibban is 80.51%, higher than state average of 75.84%. The population of children under the age of 6 years is 141 which is 9.30% of total population of Ibban, and child sex ratio is approximately 855, higher than state average of 846.

== Air travel connectivity ==
The closest airport to the village is Sri Guru Ram Dass Jee International Airport.
