= Thikriwala, Kapurthala =

Thikriwala
- Village
- Location in Punjab, India Thikriwala (India)
- Coordinates: 31.448263°N 75.368909°E
- Country: India
- State: Punjab
- District: Kapurthala

Government
  - Type: Panchayati raj (India)
  - Body: Gram panchayat

Population (2011)
  - Total: 401
- Sex ratio 216/185♂/♀

Languages
  - Official: Punjabi
  - Other spoken: Hindi
- Time zone: UTC+5:30 (IST)
- PIN: 144601
- Telephone code: 01822
- ISO 3166 code: IN-PB
- Vehicle registration: PB-09
- Website: kapurthala.gov.in

Thikriwala is a village in Kapurthala district of Punjab State, India. It is located 9 kilometres (5.6 mi) from Kapurthala, which is both district and sub-district headquarters of Thikriwala. The village is administrated by a Sarpanch who is an elected representative of village.

== Demography ==
According to the 2011 Census of India, Thikriwala had 76 houses with the total population of 401 persons of which 216 were male and 185 female. The literacy rate was 77.84%, higher than the state average of 75.84%. The population of children in the age group 0–6 years was 31 which represented 7.73% of the total population. Child sex ratio was approximately 550, lower than the state average of 846.

== Population data ==
Particulars	Total	Male	Female
Total No. of Houses	76	-	-
Population	401	216	185
Child (0–6)	31	20	11
Schedule Caste	148	78	70
Schedule Tribe	0	0	0
Literacy	77.84 %	82.14 %	72.99 %
Total Workers	236	132	104
Main Worker	219	0	0
Marginal Worker	17	13	4
