= Brindpur =

- Village
- Location in Punjab, India Brindpur (India)
- Coordinates: 31.346899°N 75.356521°E
- Country: India
- State: Punjab
- District: Kapurthala

Government
  - Type: Panchayati raj (India)
  - Body: Gram panchayat

Population (2011)
  - Total: 850
- Sex ratio 437/413♂/♀

Languages
  - Official: Punjabi
  - Other spoken: Hindi
- Time zone: UTC+5:30 (IST)
- PIN: 144602
- Telephone code: 01822
- ISO 3166 code: IN-PB
- Vehicle registration: PB-09
- Website: kapurthala.gov.in

Brindpur is a village in Kapurthala district of Punjab State, India. It is located 5 kilometres (3 mi) from Kapurthala, the headquarters of both the district and sub-district of Brindpur. The village is administrated by a Sarpanch, who is an elected representative of the village as per the constitution of India and Panchayati raj (India).

== Demography ==
According to the report published by Census India in 2011, Brindpur has a total number of 156 houses and a population of 850, including 437 males and 413 females. Brindpur's literacy rate is 81.01%, higher than the state average of 75.84%. The population of children under the age of 6 years is 76, which is 8.94% of the total population of Brindpur, and the child-sex ratio is approximately 1171, higher than the state average of 846.

== Population data ==
| Particulars | Total | Male | Female |
|---|---|---|---|
| Total No. of Houses | 156 | - | - |
| Population | 850 | 437 | 413 |
| Child (0–6) | 76 | 35 | 41 |
| Schedule Caste | 305 | 155 | 150 |
| Schedule Tribe | 0 | 0 | 0 |
| Literacy | 81.01 % | 84.58 % | 77.15 % |
| Total Workers | 297 | 258 | 39 |
| Main Worker | 291 | 0 | 0 |
| Marginal Worker | 6 | 2 | 4 |

== Air travel connectivity ==
The closest airport to the village is Sri Guru Ram Dass Jee International Airport.
