= Chak Gopipur =

- Village
- Location in Punjab, India Chak Gopipur (India)
- Coordinates: 31.377143°N 75.274156°E
- Country: India
- State: Punjab
- District: Kapurthala

Government
  - Type: Panchayati raj (India)
  - Body: Gram panchayat

Population (2011)
  - Total: 55
- Sex ratio 25/30♂/♀

Languages
  - Official: Punjabi
  - Other spoken: Hindi
- Time zone: UTC+5:30 (IST)
- PIN: 144601
- Telephone code: 01822
- ISO 3166 code: IN-PB
- Vehicle registration: PB-09
- Website: kapurthala.gov.in

Chak Gopipur is a village in Kapurthala district of Punjab State, India. It is located 8 kilometres (5.0 mi) from Kapurthala, which is both district and sub-district headquarters of Chak Gopipur. The village is administrated by a Sarpanch, who is an elected representative.

== Demography ==
According to the report published by Census India in 2011, Chak Gopipur has a total number of 14 houses and population of 55 of which include 25 males and 30 females. Literacy rate of Chak Gopipur is 79.17%, higher than state average of 75.84%. The population of children under the age of 6 years is 7 which is 12.73% of total population of Chak Gopipur, and child sex ratio is approximately 1333, higher than state average of 846.

== Population data ==
Particulars	Total	Male	Female
Total No. of Houses	14	-	-
Population	55	25	30
Child (0–6)	7	3	4
Schedule Caste	0	0	0
Schedule Tribe	0	0	0
Literacy	79.17 %	86.36 %	73.08 %
Total Workers	15	12	3
Main Worker	15	0	0
Marginal Worker	0	0	0

== Air travel connectivity ==
The closest airport to the village is Sri Guru Ram Dass Jee International Airport.
