= Nabi Bakhshwala =

- Village
- Location in Punjab, India Nabi Bakhshwala (India)
- Coordinates: 31.451957°N 75.244989°E
- Country: India
- State: Punjab
- District: Kapurthala

Government
  - Type: Panchayati raj (India)
  - Body: Gram panchayat

Population (2011)
  - Total: 18
- Sex ratio 10/8♂/♀

Languages
  - Official: Punjabi
  - Other spoken: Hindi
- Time zone: UTC+5:30 (IST)
- PIN: 144804
- Telephone code: 01822
- ISO 3166 code: IN-PB
- Vehicle registration: PB-09
- Website: kapurthala.gov.in

Nabi Bakhshwala is a village in Kapurthala district of Punjab State, India. It is located 20 kilometres (12 mi) from Kapurthala, which is both district and sub-district headquarters of Nabi Bakhshwala. The village is administrated by a Sarpanch, who is an elected representative.

== Demography ==
According to the report published by Census India in 2011, Nabi Bakhshwala has 2 houses with the total population of 18 persons of which 10 are male and 8 females. Literacy rate of Nabi Bakhshwala is 46.15%, lower than the state average of 75.84%. The population of children in the age group 0–6 years is 5 which is 27.78% of the total population. Child sex ratio is approximately 1500, higher than the state average of 846.

== Population data ==
| Particulars | Total | Male | Female |
|---|---|---|---|
| Total No. of Houses | 2 | - | - |
| Population | 18 | 10 | 8 |
| Child (0–6) | 5 | 2 | 3 |
| Schedule Caste | 5 | 2 | 3 |
| Schedule Tribe | 0 | 0 | 0 |
| Literacy | 46.15 % | 37.50 % | 60.00 % |
| Total Workers | 8 | 6 | 2 |
| Main Worker | 7 | 0 | 0 |
| Marginal Worker | 1 | 1 | 0 |

== Nearby villages ==
- Mand Dhaliwal
- Gurmukh Singhwala
- Tukra No 3
- Mand Bhandal Bet
- Bana Malwala
- Kishan Singhwala
- Tarkhanawali
- Sheikhanwala
- Alipur
- Sangojla
- Talwandi Rajputan
