= Jalal Bholana =

- Village
- Location in Punjab, India Jalal Bholana (India)
- Coordinates: 31.322984°N 75.325184°E
- Country: India
- State: Punjab
- District: Kapurthala

Government
  - Type: Panchayati raj (India)
  - Body: Gram panchayat

Population (2011)
  - Total: 1,028
- Sex ratio 548/480♂/♀

Languages
  - Official: Punjabi
  - Other spoken: Hindi
- Time zone: UTC+5:30 (IST)
- PIN: 144602
- Telephone code: 01822
- ISO 3166 code: IN-PB
- Vehicle registration: PB-09
- Website: kapurthala.gov.in

Jalal Bholana is a village in Kapurthala district of Punjab State, India. It is located 9 kilometres (5.6 mi) from Kapurthala, which is both district and sub-district headquarters of Jalal Bholana. The village is administrated by a Sarpanch, who is an elected representative.

== Demography ==
According to the report published by Census India in 2011, Jalal Bholana has total number of 219 houses and population of 1,028 of which include 548 males and 480 females. Literacy rate of Jalal Bholana is 91.91%, higher than state average of 75.84%. The population of children under the age of 6 years is 89 which is 8.66% of total population of Jalal Bholana, and child sex ratio is approximately 1225, higher than state average of 846.

== Population data ==
| Particulars | Total | Male | Female |
|---|---|---|---|
| Total No. of Houses | 219 | - | - |
| Population | 1,028 | 548 | 480 |
| Child (0-6) | 89 | 40 | 49 |
| Schedule Caste | 238 | 132 | 106 |
| Schedule Tribe | 0 | 0 | 0 |
| Literacy | 91.91 % | 96.06 % | 87.01 % |
| Total Workers | 400 | 318 | 82 |
| Main Worker | 305 | 0 | 0 |
| Marginal Worker | 95 | 49 | 46 |

== Air travel connectivity ==
The closest airport to the village is Sri Guru Ram Dass Jee International Airport.
