= Chak, Kapurthala =

Chak
- Village
- Location in Punjab, India Chak (India)
- Coordinates: 31.238171°N 76.488118°E
- Country: India
- State: Punjab
- District: Kapurthala

Government
  - Type: Panchayati raj (India)
  - Body: Gram panchayat

Population (2011)
  - Total: 309
- Sex ratio 167/142♂/♀

Languages
  - Official: Punjabi
  - Other spoken: Hindi
- Time zone: UTC+5:30 (IST)
- PIN: 144601
- Telephone code: 01822
- ISO 3166 code: IN-PB
- Vehicle registration: PB-09
- Website: kapurthala.gov.in

Chak is a village in Kapurthala district of Punjab State, India. It is located 15 kilometres (9.3 mi) from Kapurthala, which is both district and sub-district headquarters of Chak. The village is administrated by a Sarpanch, who is an elected representative.

== Demography ==
According to the report published by Census India in 2011, Chak has a total number of 62 houses and population of 309 of which include 167 males and 142 females. Literacy rate of Chak is 75.37%, lower than state average of 75.84%. The population of children under the age of 6 years is 41 which is 13.27% of total population of Chak, and child sex ratio is approximately 1929, higher than state average of 846.

== Population data ==
| Particulars | Total | Male | Female |
|---|---|---|---|
| Total No. of Houses | 62 | - | - |
| Population | 309 | 167 | 142 |
| Child (0-6) | 41 | 14 | 27 |
| Schedule Caste | 189 | 106 | 83 |
| Schedule Tribe | 0 | 0 | 0 |
| Literacy | 75.37 % | 81.70 % | 66.96 % |
| Total Workers | 119 | 109 | 10 |
| Main Worker | 116 | 0 | 0 |
| Marginal Worker | 3 | 0 | 3 |

== Air travel connectivity ==
The closest airport to the village is Sri Guru Ram Dass Jee International Airport.
