= Ghaniaki =

- Village
- Location in Punjab, India Ghaniaki (India)
- Coordinates: 31.422116°N 75.240614°E
- Country: India
- State: Punjab
- District: Kapurthala

Government
  - Type: Panchayati raj (India)
  - Body: Gram panchayat

Population (2011)
  - Total: 517
- Sex ratio 277/240♂/♀

Languages
  - Official: Punjabi
  - Other spoken: Hindi
- Time zone: UTC+5:30 (IST)
- PIN: 144804
- Telephone code: 01822
- ISO 3166 code: IN-PB
- Vehicle registration: PB-09
- Website: kapurthala.gov.in

Ghaniaki is a village in Kapurthala district of Punjab State, India. It is located 13 kilometres (8.1 mi) from Kapurthala, which is both district and sub-district headquarters of Ghaniaki. The village is administrated by a Sarpanch, who is an elected representative.

== Demography ==
According to the report published by Census India in 2011, Ghaniaki has a total number of 102 houses and population of 517 of which include 277 males and 240 females. Literacy rate of Ghaniaki is 74.62%, lower than state average of 75.84%. The population of children under the age of 6 years is 52 which is 10.06% of total population of Ghaniaki, and child sex ratio is approximately 857, higher than state average of 846.

== Population data ==
Particulars	Total	Male	Female
Total No. of Houses	102	-	-
Population	517	277	240
Child (0-6)	52	28	24
Schedule Caste	249	129	120
Schedule Tribe	0	0	0
Literacy	74.62 %	79.12 %	69.44 %
Total Workers	182	168	14
Main Worker	173	0	0
Marginal Worker	9	6	3

== Air travel connectivity ==
The closest airport to the village is Sri Guru Ram Dass Jee International Airport.
