= Machhipal =

- Village
- Location in Punjab, India Machhipal (India)
- Coordinates: 31.239642°N 75.354335°E
- Country: India
- State: Punjab
- District: Kapurthala

Government
  - Type: Panchayati raj (India)
  - Body: Gram panchayat

Population (2011)
  - Total: 303
- Sex ratio 154/149♂/♀

Languages
  - Official: Punjabi
  - Other spoken: Hindi
- Time zone: UTC+5:30 (IST)
- PIN: 144625
- Telephone code: 01822
- ISO 3166 code: IN-PB
- Vehicle registration: PB-09
- Website: kapurthala.gov.in

Machhipal is a village in Kapurthala district of Punjab State, India. It is located 17 kilometres (11 mi) from Kapurthala, which is both district and sub-district headquarters of Machhipal. The village is administrated by a Sarpanch, who is an elected representative.

== Demography ==
According to the report published by Census India in 2011, Machhipal has total number of 56 houses and population of 303 of which include 154 males and 149 females. Literacy rate of Machhipal is 62.79%, lower than state average of 75.84%. The population of children under the age of 6 years is 45 which is 14.85% of total population of Machhipal, and child sex ratio is approximately 1143, higher than state average of 846.

== Population data ==
Particulars	Total	Male	Female
Total No. of Houses	56	-	-
Population	303	154	149
Child (0–6)	45	21	24
Schedule Caste	292	146	146
Schedule Tribe	0	0	0
Literacy	62.79 %	68.42 %	56.80 %
Total Workers	98	83	15
Main Worker	92	0	0
Marginal Worker	6	4	2

== Air travel connectivity ==
The closest airport to the village is Sri Guru Ram Dass Jee International Airport.
