= Ghug =

- Village
- Location in Punjab, India Ghug (India)
- Coordinates: 30.188934°N 74.786370°E
- Country: India
- State: Punjab
- District: Kapurthala

Government
  - Type: Panchayati raj (India)
  - Body: Gram panchayat

Population (2011)
  - Total: 612
- Sex ratio 318/294♂/♀

Languages
  - Official: Punjabi
  - Other spoken: Hindi
- Time zone: UTC+5:30 (IST)
- PIN: 144601
- Telephone code: 01822
- Vehicle registration: PB-08
- Website: kapurthala.gov.in

Ghug is a village in Jalandhar district of Punjab State, India. It is located 8 kilometres (5.0 mi) from Kapurthala, which is both district and sub-district headquarters of Ghug. The village is administrated by a Sarpanch who is an elected representative.

== Demography ==
According to the 2011 census of India, Ghuga had 117 houses and a population of 612, comprising 318 males and 294 females. The literacy rate was 67.03%, lower than the state average of 75.84%. The population of children under the age of 6 years was 57 and the child sex ratio was approximately 1036, higher than state average of 846.

== Air travel connectivity ==
The closest airport to the village is Sri Guru Ram Dass Jee International Airport.
