= Dhawankhan Jagir =

- Village
- Location in Punjab, India Dhawankhan Jagir (India)
- Coordinates: 31.373622°N 75.424276°E
- Country: India
- State: Punjab
- District: Kapurthala

Government
  - Type: Panchayati raj (India)
  - Body: Gram panchayat

Population (2011)
  - Total: 594
- Sex ratio 310/284♂/♀

Languages
  - Official: Punjabi
  - Other spoken: Hindi
- Time zone: UTC+5:30 (IST)
- PIN: 144601
- Telephone code: 01822
- ISO 3166 code: IN-PB
- Vehicle registration: PB-09
- Website: kapurthala.gov.in

Dhawankhan Jagir is a village in Kapurthala district of Punjab State, India. It is located 5 kilometres (3.1 mi) from Kapurthala, which is both district and sub-district headquarters of Dhawankhan Jagir. The village is administrated by a Sarpanch, who is an elected representative.

== Demography ==
According to the 2011 Census of India, Dhawankhan Jagir then had a total number of 129 houses and population of 594 of which include 310 males and 284 females. Literacy rate of Dhawankhan Jagir was 72.47%, lower than state average of 75.84%. The population of children under the age of 6 years was 71 which was 11.95% of total population of Dhawankhan Jagir, and child sex ratio was approximately 690, lower than the state average of 846.

== Air travel connectivity ==
The closest airport to the village is Sri Guru Ram Dass Jee International Airport.
