= Adnawali =

- Village
- Location in Punjab, India Adnawali (India)
- Coordinates: 31.3805°N 75.3033°E
- Country: India
- State: Punjab
- District: Kapurthala

Government
  - Type: Panchayati raj (India)
  - Body: Gram panchayat

Languages
  - Official: Punjabi
  - Other spoken: Hindi
- Time zone: UTC+5:30 (IST)
- PIN: 144601
- Telephone code: 01822
- ISO 3166 code: IN-PB
- Vehicle registration: PB-09
- Website: kapurthala.gov.in

Adnawali is a village in Kapurthala district, Punjab of State, India. It is 6 kilometres (3.7 mi) from Kapurthala, which is both district and sub-district headquarters of Adnawali. The village is administrated by a Sarpanch, who is an elected representative of the village.

== Demography ==
As per Population Census 2011, the Adnawali village has population of 682, of which 373 are males while 309 are females. The population of children under the age of 6 years is 66, which is 9.68% of total population of Adnawali, and child sex ratio is approximately 886 higher than Punjab average of 846.

== Caste ==
The village has schedule caste (SC) constitutes 33.28% of total population of the village and it doesn't have any Schedule Tribe (ST) population.
