= Rupanpur =

- Village
- Location in Punjab, India Rupanpur (India)
- Coordinates: 31.456558°N 75.392224°E
- Country: India
- State: Punjab
- District: Kapurthala

Government
  - Type: Panchayati raj (India)
  - Body: Gram panchayat

Population (2011)
  - Total: 491
- Sex ratio 262/229♂/♀

Languages
  - Official: Punjabi
  - Other spoken: Hindi
- Time zone: UTC+5:30 (IST)
- PIN: 144401
- Telephone code: 01822
- ISO 3166 code: IN-PB
- Vehicle registration: PB-09
- Website: kapurthala.gov.in

Rupanpur is a village in Kapurthala district of Punjab State, India. It is located 11 kilometres (6.8 mi) from Kapurthala, which is both district and sub-district headquarters of Rupanpur. The village is administrated by a Sarpanch who is an elected representative of village as per the constitution of India and Panchayati raj (India).

== Demography ==
According to the report published by 2011 Census of India, Rupanpur has a total of 88 houses and population of 491, of which includes 262 males and 229 females. Literacy rate of Rupanpur is 75.00%, lower than the state average of 75.84%. The population of children under the age of 6 years is 51 which is 10.39% of total population of Rupanpur, and child sex ratio is approximately 457, lower than the state average of 846.

== Population data ==
Particulars	Total	Male	Female
Total no. of houses	88	–	–
Population	491	262	229
Children (0–6)	51	35	16
Schedule caste	141	81	60
Schedule tribe	0	0	0
Literacy	75.00%	74.45%	75.59%
Total workers	206	157	49
Main worker	142	0	0
Marginal worker	64	28	36
