= Madhopur, Kapurthala =

Madhopur
- Village
- Location in Punjab, India Madhopur (India)
- Coordinates: 32.365289°N 75.597287°E
- Country: India
- State: Punjab
- District: Kapurthala

Government
  - Type: Panchayati raj (India)
  - Body: Gram panchayat

Population (2011)
  - Total: 1,165
- Sex ratio 603/562♂/♀

Languages
  - Official: Punjabi
  - Other spoken: Hindi
- Time zone: UTC+5:30 (IST)
- PIN: 144623
- Telephone code: 01822
- ISO 3166 code: IN-PB
- Vehicle registration: PB-09
- Website: kapurthala.gov.in

Madhopur is a village in Kapurthala district of Punjab State, India. It is located 19 kilometres (12 mi) from Kapurthala, which is both district and sub-district headquarters of Madhopur. The village is administrated by a Sarpanch, who is an elected representative.

== Demography ==
According to the report published by Census India in 2011, Madhopur has total number of 225 houses and population of 1,165 of which include 603 males and 562 females. Literacy rate of Madhopur is 81.03%, higher than state average of 75.84%. The population of children under the age of 6 years is 121 which is 10.39% of total population of Madhopur, and child sex ratio is approximately 754, lower than state average of 846.

== Population data ==
Particulars	Total	Male	Female
Total No. of Houses	225	-	-
Population	1,165	603	562
Child (0-6)	121	69	52
Schedule Caste	324	178	146
Schedule Tribe	0	0	0
Literacy	81.03 %	85.21 %	76.67 %
Total Workers	392	338	54
Main Worker	379	0	0
Marginal Worker	13	4	9

== Air travel connectivity ==
The closest airport to the village is Sri Guru Ram Dass Jee International Airport.
