= Boot, Kapurthala =

Boot
- Village
- Location in Punjab, India Boot (India)
- Coordinates: 31.451984°N 75.400966°E
- Country: India
- State: Punjab
- District: Kapurthala

Government
  - Type: Panchayati raj (India)
  - Body: Gram panchayat

Population (2011)
  - Total: 3,757
- Sex ratio 1979/1778♂/♀

Languages
  - Official: Punjabi
  - Other spoken: Hindi
- Time zone: UTC+5:30 (IST)
- PIN: 144601
- Telephone code: 01822
- ISO 3166 code: IN-PB
- Vehicle registration: PB-09
- Website: kapurthala.gov.in

Boot is a village in Kapurthala district of Punjab State, India. It is located 10 kilometres (6.2 mi) from Kapurthala, which is both district and sub-district headquarters of Boot. The village is administrated by a Sarpanch, who is an elected representative.

== Demography ==
According to the report published by Census India in 2011, Boot has a total number of 623 houses and population of 3,757 of which include 1,979 males and 1,778 females. Literacy rate of Boot is 50.13%, lower than state average of 75.84%. The population of children under the age of 6 years is 607 which is 16.16% of total population of Boot, and child sex ratio is approximately 977, higher than state average of 846.

== Population data ==
Particulars	Total	Male	Female
Total No. of Houses	623	-	-
Population	3,757	1,979	1,778
Child (0–6)	607	307	300
Schedule Caste	3,715	1,960	1,755
Schedule Tribe	0	0	0
Literacy	50.13 %	62.50 %	36.13 %
Total Workers	1,303	1,133	170
Main Worker	1,199	0	0
Marginal Worker	104	52	52

== Air travel connectivity ==
The closest airport to the village is Sri Guru Ram Dass Jee International Airport.
