= Sidhwan Dona =

Sidhwan dona
- village
- India Punjab Sidhwan dona (India)
- Coordinates: 31.272484°N 75.365189°E
- Country: India
- State: Punjab
- District: Kapurthala

Population
  - Total: 13,006

Languages
  - Official: Punjabi
- Time zone: UTC+5:30 (IST)
- PIN: 144 625
- Telephone code: 01822
- Vehicle registration: PB-09
- Nearest city: Kapurthala

Sidhwan dona is a village in Kapurthala district, Punjab (India). It is 13 km away from Kapurthala and 28 km from Jalandhar. It has a population of about 4716 persons living in around 2500 households.It is known for famous international kabaddi players like Gulzaar Sidhwan, Bheera Sidhwan and many more.
