= Bhandal Dona =

- Village
- Location in Punjab, India Bhandal Dona (India)
- Coordinates: 31.289823°N 75.367816°E
- Country: India
- State: Punjab
- District: Kapurthala

Government
  - Type: Panchayati raj (India)
  - Body: Gram panchayat

Population (2011)
  - Total: 1,063
- Sex ratio 532/531♂/♀

Languages
  - Official: Punjabi
  - Other spoken: Hindi
- Time zone: UTC+5:30 (IST)
- PIN: 144602
- Telephone code: 01822
- ISO 3166 code: IN-PB
- Vehicle registration: PB-09

Bhandal Dona is a village in Kapurthala district of Punjab State, India. It is located 12 kilometres (7.5 mi) from Kapurthala, which is both district and sub-district headquarters of Bhandal Dona. The village is administrated by a Sarpanch who is an elected representative of village as per the constitution of India and Panchayati raj (India).

== Demography ==
According to the report published by Census India in 2011, Bhandal Dona has total number of 192 houses and population of 1,063 of which include 532 males and 531 females. Literacy rate of Bhandal Dona is 77.02%, higher than state average of 75.84%. The population of children under the age of 6 years is 123 which is 11.57% of total population of Bhandal Dona, and child sex ratio is approximately 1050, higher than state average of 846.

== Population data ==
| Particulars | Total | Male | Female |
|---|---|---|---|
| Total No. of Houses | 192 | - | - |
| Population | 1,063 | 532 | 531 |
| Child (0–6) | 123 | 60 | 63 |
| Schedule Caste | 437 | 216 | 221 |
| Schedule Tribe | 0 | 0 | 0 |
| Literacy | 77.02 % | 80.93 % | 73.08 % |
| Total Workers | 347 | 284 | 63 |
| Main Worker | 225 | 0 | 0 |
| Marginal Worker | 122 | 72 | 50 |

== Air travel connectivity ==
The closest airport to the village is Sri Guru Ram Dass Jee International Airport.
