= Dhak Plahi =

- Village
- Location in Punjab, India Dhak Plahi (India)
- Coordinates: 31.266590°N 75.761859°E
- Country: India
- State: Punjab
- District: Kapurthala

Government
  - Type: Panchayati raj (India)
  - Body: Gram panchayat

Population (2011)
  - Total: 263
- Sex ratio 146/117♂/♀

Languages
  - Official: Punjabi
  - Other spoken: Hindi
- Time zone: UTC+5:30 (IST)
- PIN: 144401
- Telephone code: 01822
- ISO 3166 code: IN-PB
- Vehicle registration: PB-09
- Website: kapurthala.gov.in

Dhak Plahi is a village in Phagwara Tehsil in Kapurthala district of Punjab State, India. It is located 40 kilometres (25 mi) from Kapurthala, 4 kilometres (2.5 mi) from Phagwara. The village is administrated by a Sarpanch, who is an elected representative.

== Demography ==
According to the report published by Census India in 2011, Dhak Plahi has 54 houses with the total population of 263 persons of which 146 are male and 117 females. Literacy rate of Dhak Plahi is 82.45%, higher than the state average of 75.84%. The population of children in the age group 0–6 years is 18 which is 6.84% of the total population. Child sex ratio is approximately 1571, higher than the state average of 846.

As per census 2011, 90 people were engaged in work activities out of the total population of Dhak Plahi which includes 87 males and 3 females. According to census survey report 2011, 93.33% workers (Employment or Earning more than 6 Months) describe their work as main work and 6.67% workers are involved in Marginal activity providing livelihood for less than 6 months.

== Population data ==
Particulars	Total	Male	Female
Total No. of Houses	54	-	-
Population	263	146	117
Child (0-6)	18	7	11
Schedule Caste	134	68	66
Schedule Tribe	0	0	0
Literacy	82.45 %	83.45 %	81.13 %
Total Workers	90	87	3
Main Worker	84	0	0
Marginal Worker	6	5	1

== Caste ==
The village has schedule caste (SC) constitutes 50.95% of total population of the village and it doesn't have any Schedule Tribe (ST) population.
