= Biharipur, Kapurthala =

Biharipur
- Village
- Location in Punjab, India Biharipur (India)
- Coordinates: 31.404009°N 75.141934°E
- Country: India
- State: Punjab
- District: Kapurthala

Government
  - Type: Panchayati raj (India)
  - Body: Gram panchayat

Population (2011)
  - Total: 954
- Sex ratio 486/468♂/♀

Languages
  - Official: Punjabi
  - Other spoken: Hindi
- Time zone: UTC+5:30 (IST)
- PIN: 144602
- Telephone code: 01822
- ISO 3166 code: IN-PB
- Vehicle registration: PB-09
- Website: kapurthala.gov.in

Biharipur is a village in Kapurthala district of Punjab State, India. It is located 16 kilometres (9.9 mi) from Kapurthala, which is both district and sub-district headquarters of Biharipur. The village is administrated by a Sarpanch, who is an elected representative.

== Demography ==
According to the report published by Census India in 2011, Biharipur has a total number of 208 houses and population of 954 of which include 486 males and 468 females. Literacy rate of Biharipur is 79.96%, higher than state average of 75.84%. The population of children under the age of 6 years is 61 which is 6.39% of total population of Biharipur, and child sex ratio is approximately 694, lower than state average of 846.

== Population data ==
Particulars	Total	Male	Female
Total No. of Houses	208	-	-
Population	954	486	468
Child (0–6)	61	36	25
Schedule Caste	126	73	53
Schedule Tribe	0	0	0
Literacy	79.96 %	84.22 %	75.62 %
Total Workers	272	239	33
Main Worker	260	0	0
Marginal Worker	12	5	7

== Air travel connectivity ==
The closest airport to the village is Sri Guru Ram Dass Jee International Airport.
