= Ghuluwal =

- Village
- Location in Punjab, India Ghuluwal (India)
- Coordinates: 31.497734°N 75.349963°E
- Country: India
- State: Punjab
- District: Kapurthala

Government
  - Type: Panchayati raj (India)
  - Body: Gram panchayat

Population (2011)
  - Total: 122
- Sex ratio 71/51♂/♀

Languages
  - Official: Punjabi
  - Other spoken: Hindi
- Time zone: UTC+5:30 (IST)
- PIN: 144804
- Telephone code: 01822
- ISO 3166 code: IN-PB
- Vehicle registration: PB-09
- Website: kapurthala.gov.in

Ghuluwal is a village in Kapurthala district of Punjab State, India. It is located 26 kilometres (16 mi) from Kapurthala, which is both district and sub-district headquarters of Ghuluwal. The village is administrated by a Sarpanch, who is an elected representative.

== Demography ==
According to the report published by Census India in 2011, Ghuluwal has total number of 23 houses and population of 122 of which include 71 males and 51 females. Literacy rate of Ghuluwal is 83.04%, higher than state average of 75.84%. The population of children under the age of 6 years is 10 which is 8.20% of total population of Ghuluwal, and child sex ratio is approximately 667, lower than state average of 846.

== Population data ==
Particulars	Total	Male	Female
Total No. of Houses	23	-	-
Population	122	71	51
Child (0-6)	10	6	4
Schedule Caste	71	42	29
Schedule Tribe	0	0	0
Literacy	83.04 %	86.15 %	78.72 %
Total Workers	40	40	0
Main Worker	40	0	0
Marginal Worker	0	0	0

== Air travel connectivity ==
The closest airport to the village is Sri Guru Ram Dass Jee International Airport.
