= Nangal Naraingarh =

- Village
- Location in Punjab, India Nangal Naraingarh (India)
- Coordinates: 31.325404°N 75.418449°E
- Country: India
- State: Punjab
- District: Kapurthala

Government
  - Type: Panchayati raj (India)
  - Body: Gram panchayat

Population (2011)
  - Total: 148
- Sex ratio 81/67 ♂/♀

Languages
  - Official: Punjabi
  - Other spoken: Hindi
- Time zone: UTC+5:30 (IST)
- PIN: 144601
- Telephone code: 01822
- ISO 3166 code: IN-PB
- Vehicle registration: PB-09
- Website: kapurthala.gov.in

Nangal Naraingarh is a village in Kapurthala district of Punjab State, India. It is located 8 kilometres (5.0 mi) from Kapurthala, which is both district and sub-district headquarters of Nangal Naraingarh. The village is administrated by a Sarpanch who is an elected representative of village as per the constitution of India and Panchayati raj (India).

== Demography ==
According to the report published by Census India in 2011, Nangal Naraingarh had a total number of 28 houses and population of 148, which included 81 males and 67 females. Literacy rate of Nangal Naraingarh was 68.55%, lower than the state average of 75.84%. The population of children under the age of 6 years was 24 which was 16.22% of the total population of Nangal Naraingarh, and child sex ratio was approximately 846, equal to the state average of 846.

== Population data ==
Particulars	Total	Male	Female
Total No. of Houses	28	-	-
Population	148	81	67
Child (0-6)	24	13	11
Schedule Caste	130	72	58
Schedule Tribe	0	0	0
Literacy	68.55 %	73.53 %	62.50 %
Total Workers	53	45	8
Main Worker	49	0	0
Marginal Worker	4	1	3

== Air travel connectivity ==
The closest airport to the village is Sri Guru Ram Dass Jee International Airport.
