= Bibri =

- Village
- Location in Punjab, India Bibri (India)
- Coordinates: 31.337983°N 75.333930°E
- Country: India
- State: Punjab
- District: Kapurthala

Government
  - Type: Panchayati raj (India)
  - Body: Gram panchayat

Population (2011)
  - Total: 225
- Sex ratio 117/108♂/♀

Languages
  - Official: Punjabi
  - Other spoken: Hindi
- Time zone: UTC+5:30 (IST)
- PIN: 144602
- Telephone code: 01822
- ISO 3166 code: IN-PB
- Vehicle registration: PB-09
- Website: kapurthala.gov.in

Bibri is a village in Kapurthala district of Punjab State, India. It is located 7 kilometres (4.3 mi) from Kapurthala, which is both district and sub-district headquarters of Bibri. The village is administrated by a Sarpanch who is an elected representative of village as per the constitution of India and Panchayati raj (India).

== Demography ==
According to the report published by Census India in 2011, Bibri has a total number of 46 houses and population of 225 of which include 117 males and 108 females. Literacy rate of Bibri is 81.43%, higher than state average of 75.84%. The population of children under the age of 6 years is 15 which is 6.67% of total population of Bibri, and child sex ratio is approximately 667, lower than state average of 846.

== Population data ==
Particulars	Total	Male	Female
Total No. of Houses	46	-	-
Population	225	117	108
Child (0–6)	15	9	6
Schedule Caste	46	21	25
Schedule Tribe	0	0	0
Literacy	81.43 %	85.19 %	77.45 %
Total Workers	79	67	12
Main Worker	75	0	0
Marginal Worker	4	0	4

== Air travel connectivity ==
The closest airport to the village is Sri Guru Ram Dass Jee International Airport.
