= Hambowal =

- Village
- ਹਬੋਵਾਲ
- Location in Punjab, India Hambowal (India)
- Coordinates: 30.963532°N 76.246464°E
- Country: India
- State: Punjab
- District: Kapurthala

Government
  - Type: Panchayati raj (India)
  - Body: Gram panchayat

Population (2011)
  - Total: 864
- Sex ratio 432/432♂/♀

Languages
  - Official: Punjabi
  - Other spoken: Hindi
- Time zone: UTC+5:30 (IST)
- PIN: 144804
- Telephone code: 01822
- ISO 3166 code: IN-PB
- Vehicle registration: PB-09
- Website: kapurthala.gov.in

Hambowal is a village in Kapurthala district of Punjab State, India. It is located 10 kilometres (6.2 mi) from Kapurthala, which is both district and sub-district headquarters of Hambowal. The village is administrated by a Sarpanch, who is an elected representative.

== Demography ==
According to the report published by Census India in 2011, Hambowal has total number of 166 houses and population of 864 of which include 432 males and 432 females. Literacy rate of Hambowal is 76.26%, higher than state average of 75.84%. The population of children under the age of 6 years is 89 which is 10.30% of total population of Hambowal, and child sex ratio is approximately 648, lower than state average of 846.

== Population data ==
Particulars	Total	Male	Female
Total No. of Houses	166	-	-
Population	864	432	432
Child (0-6)	89	54	35
Schedule Caste	328	167	161
Schedule Tribe	0	0	0
Literacy	76.26 %	79.37 %	73.30 %
Total Workers	390	258	132
Main Worker	258	0	0
Marginal Worker	132	36	96

== Air travel connectivity ==
The closest airport to the village is Sri Guru Ram Dass Jee International Airport. Shaheed Bhagat Singh Airport Chandigarh Airport
