= Paharipur =

- Village
- Location in Punjab, India Paharipur (India)
- Coordinates: 31.458216°N 75.403516°E
- Country: India
- State: Punjab
- District: Kapurthala

Government
  - Type: Panchayati raj (India)
  - Body: Gram panchayat

Population (2011)
  - Total: 702
- Sex ratio 373/329♂/♀

Languages
  - Official: Punjabi
  - Other spoken: Hindi
- Time zone: UTC+5:30 (IST)
- PIN: 144601
- Telephone code: 01822
- ISO 3166 code: IN-PB
- Vehicle registration: PB-09
- Website: kapurthala.gov.in

Paharipur is a village in Kapurthala district of Punjab State, India. It is located 10 kilometres (6.2 mi) from Kapurthala, which is both district and sub-district headquarters of Paharipur. The village is administrated by a Sarpanch who is an elected representative of village as per the constitution of India and Panchayati raj (India).

== Demography ==
According to the report published by Census India in 2011, Paharipur has 129 houses with total population of 702 persons of which 373 are male and 329 females. Literacy rate of Paharipur is 74.68%, lower than the state average of 75.84%. The population of children in the age group 0–6 years is 74 which is 10.54% of total population. Child sex ratio is approximately 850, higher than the state average of 846.

== Population data ==
| Particulars | Total | Male | Female |
|---|---|---|---|
| Total No. of Houses | 129 | - | - |
| Population | 702 | 373 | 329 |
| Child (0-6) | 74 | 40 | 34 |
| Schedule Caste | 431 | 225 | 206 |
| Schedule Tribe | 0 | 0 | 0 |
| Literacy | 74.68 % | 82.28 % | 66.10 % |
| Total Workers | 281 | 233 | 48 |
| Main Worker | 243 | 0 | 0 |
| Marginal Worker | 38 | 19 | 19 |
