= Dhapai, Kapurthala =

Dhapai
- Village
- Location in Punjab, India Dhapai (India)
- Coordinates: 31.346666°N 75.433016°E
- Country: India
- State: Punjab
- District: Kapurthala

Government
  - Type: Panchayati raj (India)
  - Body: Gram panchayat

Population (2011)
  - Total: 1,208
- Sex ratio 635/573♂/♀

Languages
  - Official: Punjabi
  - Other spoken: Hindi
- Time zone: UTC+5:30 (IST)
- PIN: 144601
- Telephone code: 01822
- ISO 3166 code: IN-PB
- Vehicle registration: PB-09
- Website: kapurthala.gov.in

Dhapai is a village in Kapurthala district of Punjab State, India. It is located 8 kilometres (5.0 mi) from Kapurthala, which is both district and sub-district headquarters of Dhapai. The village is administrated by a Sarpanch, who is an elected representative.

== Demography ==
According to the 2011 Census of India, Dhapai then had a 265 houses and a population of 1,208, comprising 635 males and 573 females. The literacy rate was 81.76%, higher than state average of 75.84%. The population of children under the age of 6 years was 106 and the child sex ratio was approximately 536, lower than state average of 846. The population included 27.4 percent who were designated as Scheduled Castes. There were none designated as Scheduled Tribes.

== Air travel connectivity ==
The closest airport to the village is Sri Guru Ram Dass Jee International Airport.
