= Araianwala =

- Village
- Location in Punjab, India Araianwala (India)
- Coordinates: 30.554242°N 74.304855°E
- Country: India
- State: Punjab
- District: Kapurthala

Government
  - Type: Panchayati raj (India)
  - Body: Gram panchayat

Population (2011)
  - Total: 812
- Sex ratio 421 /391♂/♀

Languages
  - Official: Punjabi
  - Other spoken: Hindi
- Time zone: UTC+5:30 (IST)
- PIN: 144620
- Telephone code: 01822
- ISO 3166 code: IN-PB
- Vehicle registration: PB-09
- Website: kapurthala.gov.in

Araianwala is a village in Kapurthala district of Punjab State, India. It is located 7 km away from Kapurthala, which is both district & sub-district headquarter of Araianwala village. The village is administrated by Sarpanch an elected representative of the village.

== Demography ==
According to the report published by Census India in 2011, Araianwala has a total number of 152 houses and population of 812 of which include 421 males and 391 females. Literacy rate of Araianwala is 74.01%, lower than state average of 75.84%. The population of children under the age of 6 years is 108 which is 13.30% of total population of Araianwala, and child sex ratio is approximately 929 higher than state average of 846.

== Population data ==
Particulars	Total	Male	Female
Total No. of Houses	152	-	-
Population	812	421	391
Child (0–6)	108	56	52
Schedule Caste	326	179	147
Schedule Tribe	0	0	0
Literacy	74.01 %	75.34 %	72.57 %
Total Workers	319	246	73
Main Worker	260	0	0
Marginal Worker	59	28	31

== Air travel connectivity ==
The closest airport to the village is Sri Guru Ram Dass Jee International Airport.
