= Sangojla =

- Village
- Location in Punjab, India Sangojla (India)
- Coordinates: 31.433628°N 75.277701°E
- Country: India
- State: Punjab
- District: Kapurthala

Government
  - Type: Panchayati raj (India)
  - Body: Gram panchayat

Population (2011)
  - Total: 1,767
- Sex ratio 893/874♂/♀

Languages
  - Official: Punjabi
  - Other spoken: Hindi
- Time zone: UTC+5:30 (IST)
- PIN: 144804
- Telephone code: 01822
- ISO 3166 code: IN-PB
- Vehicle registration: PB-09
- Website: kapurthala.gov.in

Sangojla is a village in Kapurthala district of Punjab State, India. It is located 15 kilometres (9.3 mi) from Kapurthala, which is both district and sub-district headquarters of Sangojla. The village is administrated by a Sarpanch, who is an elected representative.

== Demography ==
According to the report published by Census India in 2011, Sangojla has total number of 356 houses and population of 1,767 of which include 893 males and 874 females. Literacy rate of Sangojla is 72.74%, lower than state average of 75.84%. The population of children under the age of 6 years is 186 which is 10.53% of total population of Sangojla, and child sex ratio is approximately 842, lower than state average of 846.

== Population data ==
Particulars	Total	Male	Female
Total No. of Houses	356	-	-
Population	1,767	893	874
Child (0-6)	186	101	85
Schedule Caste	827	425	402
Schedule Tribe	0	0	0
Literacy	72.74 %	76.89 %	68.57 %
Total Workers	593	504	89
Main Worker	570	0	0
Marginal Worker	23	6	17

== Air travel connectivity ==
The closest airport to the village is Sri Guru Ram Dass Jee International Airport.
