= Mainwan =

- Village
- Location in Punjab, India Mainwan (India)
- Coordinates: 31.371946°N 75.427918°E
- Country: India
- State: Punjab
- District: Kapurthala

Government
  - Type: Panchayati raj (India)
  - Body: Gram panchayat

Population (2011)
  - Total: 837
- Sex ratio 438/399♂/♀

Languages
  - Official: Punjabi
  - Other spoken: Hindi
- Time zone: UTC+5:30 (IST)
- PIN: 144601
- Telephone code: 01822
- ISO 3166 code: IN-PB
- Vehicle registration: PB-09
- Website: kapurthala.gov.in

Mainwan is a village in Kapurthala district of Punjab State, India. It is located 4 kilometres (2.5 mi) from Kapurthala, which is both district and sub-district headquarters of Mainwan. The village is administrated by a Sarpanch, who is an elected representative…

== Demography ==
According to the report published by Census India in 2011, Mainwan has total number of 168 houses and population of 837 of which include 438 males and 399 females. Literacy rate of Mainwan is 75.90%, higher than state average of 75.84%. The population of children under the age of 6 years is 90 which is 10.75% of total population of Mainwan, and child sex ratio is approximately 1045, higher than state average of 846.

== Population data ==
Particulars	Total	Male	Female
Total No. of Houses	168	-	-
Population	837	438	399
Child (0-6)	90	44	46
Schedule Caste	652	343	309
Schedule Tribe	0	0	0
Literacy	75.90 %	81.98 %	69.12 %
Total Workers	284	228	56
Main Worker	283	0	0
Marginal Worker	1	1	03

== Air travel connectivity ==
The closest airport to the village is Sri Guru Ram Dass Jee International Airport.
