= Sunran Rajputan =

- Village
- Location in Punjab, India Sunran Rajputan (India)
- Coordinates: 31.209674°N 75.716796°E
- Country: India
- State: Punjab
- District: Kapurthala

Government
  - Type: Panchayati raj (India)
  - Body: Gram panchayat

Population (2011)
  - Total: 915
- Sex ratio 488/427♂/♀

Languages
  - Official: Punjabi
  - Other spoken: Hindi
- Time zone: UTC+5:30 (IST)
- PIN: 144402
- Telephone code: 01824
- ISO 3166 code: IN-PB
- Vehicle registration: PB-09and pb36
- Website: kapurthala.gov.in

Sunran Rajputan is a village in Phagwara Tehsil in Kapurthala district of Punjab, India. It is located 50 kilometres (31 mi) from Kapurthala, 5 kilometres (3.1 mi) from Phagwara. The village is administrated by a Sarpanch who is an elected representative of village. Writer, political leader, cultural figure, S. Dalvinder Singh Ghuman is a resident of this village. While living abroad, he is a thinker and a concern for the village and Punjab. This village belonged to Rajput Muslims, who settled there after the 1947 partition of the country, when the Muslims migrated to Pakistan and the Sikhs came and settled there. The village has a beautiful new building, the Gurdwara Singh Sabha. There are shrines of Muslim saints. In At the time of partition in 1947, Sardar Kesar Singh Numberdar, being a Sikh, Deserted from Pakistan and settled in this village in India. This village was also known as Tikka Sardar, who was from the family of the then Raja of Kapurthala Jagatjit Singh.

== Transport ==
Phagwara Junction Railway Station, Mauli Halt Railway Station are nearby railway stations to Sunran Rajputan. Jalandhar City Railway station is 23 km away from the village. The village is 118 km away from Sri Guru Ram Dass Jee International Airport in Amritsar. Another nearby airport is Sahnewal Airport in Ludhiana which is located 40 km away from the village.
