= Bijli Nangal =

- Village
- Location in Punjab, India Bijli Nangal (India)
- Coordinates: 31.468995°N 75.331015°E
- Country: India
- State: Punjab
- District: Kapurthala

Government
  - Type: Panchayati raj (India)
  - Body: Gram panchayat

Population (2011)
  - Total: 478
- Sex ratio 252/226♂/♀

Languages
  - Official: Punjabi
  - Other spoken: Hindi
- Time zone: UTC+5:30 (IST)
- PIN: 144601
- Telephone code: 01822
- ISO 3166 code: IN-PB
- Vehicle registration: PB-09
- Website: kapurthala.gov.in

Bijli Nangal is a village in Kapurthala district of Punjab State, India. It is located 17 kilometres (11 mi) from Kapurthala, which is both district and sub-district headquarters of Bijli Nangal. The village is administrated by a Sarpanch, who is an elected representative.

== Demography ==
According to the report published by Census India in 2011, Bijli Nangal has a total number of 89 houses and population of 478 of which include 252 males and 226 females. Literacy rate of Bijli Nangal is 57.21%, lower than state average of 75.84%. The population of children under the age of 6 years is 76 which is 15.90% of total population of Bijli Nangal, and child sex ratio is approximately 1111, higher than state average of 846.

== Air travel connectivity ==
The closest airport to the village is Sri Guru Ram Dass Jee International Airport.
