= Mudowal =

- Village
- Location in Punjab, India Mudowal (India)
- Coordinates: 31.320063°N 75.369273°E
- Country: India
- State: Punjab
- District: Kapurthala

Government
  - Type: Panchayati raj (India)
  - Body: Gram panchayat

Population (2011)
  - Total: 1,060
- Sex ratio 547/513♂/♀

Languages
  - Official: Punjabi
  - Other spoken: Hindi
- Time zone: UTC+5:30 (IST)
- PIN: 144802
- Telephone code: 01822
- ISO 3166 code: IN-PB
- Vehicle registration: PB-09
- Website: kapurthala.gov.in

Mudowal is a village in Kapurthala district of Punjab State, India. It is located 12 kilometres (7.5 mi) from Kapurthala, which is both the district and sub-district headquarters of Mudowal. The village is administrated by a Sarpanch, who is an elected representative.

== Demography ==
According to the report published by Census India in 2011, Mudowal has total number of 216 houses and population of 1,060 of which include 547 males and 513 females. Literacy rate of Mudowal is 75.52%, lower than state average of 75.84%. The population of children under the age of 6 years is 100 which is 9.43% of total population of Mudowal, and child sex ratio is approximately 754, lower than state average of 846.

== Population data ==
Particulars	Total	Male	Female
Total No. of Houses	216	-	-
Total Population	1,060	547	513
In the age group 0–6 years	100	57	43
Scheduled Castes (SC)	418	216	202
Scheduled Tribes (ST)	0	0	0
Literates	725	385	340
Illiterate	335	162	173
Total Worker	383	352	31
Main Worker	369	341	28
Marginal Worker	14	11	3

== Air travel connectivity ==
The closest airport to the village is Sri Guru Ram Dass Jee International Airport.
