= Dhak Balaloan =

- Village
- Location in Punjab, India Dhak Balaloan (India)
- Coordinates: 31.237139°N 75.849038°E
- Country: India
- State: Punjab
- District: Kapurthala

Government
  - Type: Panchayati raj (India)
  - Body: Gram panchayat

Population (2011)
  - Total: 405
- Sex ratio 193/212♂/♀

Languages
  - Official: Punjabi
  - Other spoken: Hindi
- Time zone: UTC+5:30 (IST)
- PIN: 144401
- Telephone code: 01822
- ISO 3166 code: IN-PB
- Vehicle registration: PB-09
- Website: kapurthala.gov.in

Dhak Balaloan is a village in Phagwara Tehsil in Kapurthala district of Punjab State, India. It is located 42 kilometres (26 mi) from Kapurthala, 6 kilometres (3.7 mi) from Phagwara. The village is administrated by a Sarpanch, who is an elected representative.

== Demography ==
According to the report published by Census India in 2011, Dhak Balaloan has 73 houses with the total population of 405 persons of which 193 are male and 212 females. Literacy rate of Dhak Balaloan is 80.22%, higher than the state average of 75.84%. The population of children in the age group 0–6 years is 36 which is 8.89% of the total population. Child sex ratio is approximately 1769, higher than the state average of 846.

== Population data ==
Particulars	Total	Male	Female
Total No. of Houses	73	-	-
Population	405	193	212
Child (0-6)	36	13	23
Schedule Caste	390	187	203
Schedule Tribe	0	0	0
Literacy	80.22 %	86.67 %	74.07 %
Total Workers	153	121	32
Main Worker	126	0	0
Marginal Worker	27	27	0
