= Nidoki =

- Village
- Location in Punjab, India Nidoki (India)
- Coordinates: 31.252525°N 75.368909°E
- Country: India
- State: Punjab
- District: Kapurthala

Government
  - Type: Panchayati raj (India)
  - Body: Gram panchayat

Population (2011)
  - Total: 108
- Sex ratio 53/55♂/♀

Languages
  - Official: Punjabi
  - Other spoken: Hindi
- Time zone: UTC+5:30 (IST)
- PIN: 144625
- Telephone code: 01822
- ISO 3166 code: IN-PB
- Vehicle registration: PB-09
- Website: kapurthala.gov.in

Nidoki is a village in Kapurthala district of Punjab State, India. It is located 16 kilometres (9.9 mi) from Kapurthala, which is both district and sub-district headquarters of Nidoki. The village is administrated by a Sarpanch who is an elected representative.

== Demography ==
According to the 2011 Census of India, Nidoki has total number of 22 houses and population of 108 of which include 53 males and 55 females. Literacy rate of Nidoki is 71.28%, lower than state average of 75.84%. The population of children under the age of 6 years is 14 which is 12.96% of total population of Nidoki, and child sex ratio is approximately 1000, higher than state average of 846.
