= Thigli =

- Village
- Location in Punjab, India Thigli (India)
- Coordinates: 31.254196°N 75.356157°E
- Country: India
- State: Punjab
- District: Kapurthala

Government
  - Type: Panchayati raj (India)
  - Body: Gram panchayat

Population (2011)
  - Total: 924
- Sex ratio 483/441♂/♀

Languages
  - Official: Punjabi
  - Other spoken: Hindipunjabi french English
- Time zone: UTC+5:30 (IST)
- PIN: 144625
- Telephone code: 01822
- ISO 3166 code: IN-PB
- Vehicle registration: PB-09
- Website: kapurthala.gov.in

Thigli is a village in Kapurthala district of Punjab State, India. It is located 16 kilometres (9.9 mi) from Kapurthala, which is both district and sub-district headquarters of Thigli. The village is administrated by a Sarpanch who is an elected representative of village as per the constitution of India and Panchayati raj (India).

Kapurthala - 0 km, Dhilwan - 17 km, Nadala - 21 km, Rayya-6 - 25 km are the nearest taluks and Kapurthala - 2 km, Jalandhar - 21 km, Tarn Taran - 50 km and Hoshiarpur- 59 km are the nearby District Headquarters to the village.

== Transport ==
Kapurthala - 0 km, Kartarpur - 13 km, Jalandhar - 22 km and Jalandhar Cantt. - 24 km are the nearby Cities to Thigli.

=== Train ===
Kapurthala Railway station - 1 km, Rail Coach Factory Railway station - 7 km, Khojewala Railway station - 9 km and Husainpur Railway station - 10 km are the very nearby railway stations to Thigli, however Jalandhar City Railway station is major railway station is 23 km away from Thigli village.

=== Air ===
Raja Sansi airport:- 73 km, Pathankot airport:- 107 km, Ludhiana airport:- 77 km and Gaggal airport:- 148 km nearest airports are available to Thigli village.

== Schools ==
- Government Public School, Thigli.

== Colleges ==
- College Of Engineering & Management, Kapurthala.
- Guru Nanak College Of Education For Women, Kapurthala.
- NSJA Government College, Kapurthala.
- CAPARO P.T.U.School Of Manufacturing And Materials Technology, Kapurthala.

== Air travel connectivity ==
The closest airport to the village is Sri Guru Ram Dass Jee International Airport.
