= Kesarpur =

- Village
- Location in Punjab, India Kesarpur (India)
- Coordinates: 31.270225°N 75.400966°E
- Country: India
- State: Punjab
- District: Kapurthala

Government
  - Type: Panchayati raj (India)
  - Body: Gram panchayat

Population (2011)
  - Total: 493
- Sex ratio 247/246♂/♀

Languages
  - Official: Punjabi
  - Other spoken: Hindi
- Time zone: UTC+5:30 (IST)
- PIN: 144625
- Telephone code: 01822
- ISO 3166 code: IN-PB
- Vehicle registration: PB-09
- Website: kapurthala.gov.in

Kesarpur is a village in Kapurthala district of Punjab State, India. It is located 9 kilometres (5.6 mi) from Kapurthala, which is both district and sub-district headquarters of Kesarpur. The village is administrated by a Sarpanch who is an elected representative of village as per the constitution of India and Panchayati raj (India).

== Demography ==
According to the report published by Census India in 2011, Kesarpur has 106 houses with the total population of 493 persons of which 247 are male and 246 females. Literacy rate of Kesarpur is 74.49%, lower than the state average of 75.84%. The population of children in the age group 0–6 years is 54 which is 10.95% of the total population. Child sex ratio is approximately 636, lower than the state average of 846.

== Population data ==
Particulars	Total	Male	Female
Total No. of Houses	106	-	-
Population	493	247	246
Child (0-6)	54	33	21
Schedule Caste	122	59	63
Schedule Tribe	0	0	0
Literacy	74.49 %	80.37 %	68.89 %
Total Workers	140	116	24
Main Worker	120	0	0
Marginal Worker	20	15	5
