= Talwandi Mehma =

- Village
- Location in Punjab, India Talwandi Mehma (India)
- Coordinates: 31.351549°N 75.375446°E
- Country: India
- State: Punjab
- District: Kapurthala

Government
  - Type: Panchayati raj (India)
  - Body: Gram panchayat

Population (2011)
  - Total: 1,396
- Sex ratio 715/681♂/♀

Languages
  - Official: Punjabi
  - Other spoken: Hindi
- Time zone: UTC+5:30 (IST)
- PIN: 144601
- Telephone code: 01822
- ISO 3166 code: IN-PB
- Vehicle registration: PB-09
- Website: kapurthala.gov.in

Talwandi Mehma is a village in Kapurthala district of Punjab State, India. It is located 1 kilometre (0.62 mi) from Kapurthala, which is both district and sub-district headquarters of Talwandi Mehma. The village is administrated by a Sarpanch, who is an elected representative.

== Demography ==
According to the report published by Census India in 2011, Talwandi Mehma has total number of 258 houses and population of 1,396 of which include 715 males and 681 females. Literacy rate of Talwandi Mehma is 72.67%, lower than state average of 75.84%. The population of children under the age of 6 years is 141 which is 10.10% of total population of Talwandi Mehma, and child sex ratio is approximately 905, higher than state average of 846.

== Population data ==
Particulars	Total	Male	Female
Total No. of Houses	258	-	-
Total Population	1,396	715	681
In the age group 0–6 years	141	74	67
Scheduled Castes (SC)	984	510	474
Scheduled Tribes (ST)	0	0	0
Literates	912	498	414
Illiterate	484	217	267
Total Worker	471	399	72
Main Worker	305	274	31
Marginal Worker	166	125	41

== Air travel connectivity ==
The closest airport to the village is Sri Guru Ram Dass Jee International Airport.
