= Peerewal =

- Village
- Location in Punjab, India Peerewal (India)
- Coordinates: 31.430496°N 75.240614°E
- Country: India
- State: Punjab
- District: Kapurthala

Government
  - Type: Panchayati raj (India)
  - Body: Gram panchayat

Population (2011)
  - Total: 596
- Sex ratio 314/282♂/♀

Languages
  - Official: Punjabi
  - Other spoken: Hindi
- Time zone: UTC+5:30 (IST)
- PIN: 144621
- Telephone code: 01822
- ISO 3166 code: IN-PB
- Vehicle registration: PB-09
- Website: kapurthala.gov.in

Peerewal is a village in Kapurthala district of Punjab State, India. It is located 15 kilometres (9.3 mi) from Kapurthala, which is both district and sub-district headquarters of Peerewal. The village is administrated by a Sarpanch, who is an elected representative.

== Demography ==
According to the report published by Census India in 2011, Peerewal has total number of 110 houses and population of 596 of which include 314 males and 282 females. Literacy rate of Peerewal is 73.99%, lower than state average of 75.84%. The population of children under the age of 6 years is 100 which is 16.78% of total population of Peerewal, and child sex ratio is approximately 852, higher than state average of 846.

== Population data ==
Particulars	Total	Male	Female
Total No. of Houses	110	-	-
Population	596	314	282
Child (0-6)	100	54	46
Schedule Caste	485	257	228
Schedule Tribe	0	0	0
Literacy	73.99 %	81.15 %	66.10 %
Total Workers	168	155	13
Main Worker	159	0	0
Marginal Worker	9	5	4

== Air travel connectivity ==
The closest airport to the village is Sri Guru Ram Dass Jee International Airport.
