= Daulo Araian =

- Village
- Location in Punjab, India Daulo Araian (India)
- Coordinates: 31.147130°N 75.341218°E
- Country: India
- State: Punjab
- District: Kapurthala

Government
  - Type: Panchayati raj (India)
  - Body: Gram panchayat

Population (2011)
  - Total: 103
- Sex ratio 61/42♂/♀

Languages
  - Official: Punjabi
  - Other spoken: Hindi
- Time zone: UTC+5:30 (IST)
- PIN: 144620
- Telephone code: 01822
- ISO 3166 code: IN-PB
- Vehicle registration: PB-09
- Website: kapurthala.gov.in

Daulo Araian is a village in Kapurthala district of Punjab State, India. It is located 8 kilometres (5.0 mi) from Kapurthala, which is both district and sub-district headquarters of Daulo Araian. The village is administrated by a Sarpanch, who is an elected representative.

== Demography ==
According to the report published by Census India in 2011, Daulo Araian has a total number of 21 houses and population of 103 of which include 61 males and 42 females. Literacy rate of Daulo Araian is 80.81%, higher than state average of 75.84%. The population of children under the age of 6 years is 4 which is 3.88% of total population of Daulo Araian, and child sex ratio is approximately 0, lower than state average of 846.

== Caste ==
The village has schedule caste (SC) constitutes zero percentage of total population of the village and it doesn't have any Schedule Tribe (ST) population.

== Population data ==
Particulars	Total	Male	Female
Total No. of Houses	21	-	-
Population	103	61	42
Child (0-6)	4	4	0
Schedule Caste	0	0	0
Schedule Tribe	0	0	0
Literacy	80.81 %	84.21 %	76.19 %
Total Workers	35	34	1
Main Worker	35	0	0
Marginal Worker	0	0	0

== Air travel connectivity ==
The closest airport to the village is Sri Guru Ram Dass Jee International Airport.
