= Tanda Bhagana =

- Village
- Location in Punjab, India Tanda Bhagana (India)
- Coordinates: 31.335464°N 75.838870°E
- Country: India
- State: Punjab
- District: Kapurthala

Government
  - Type: Panchayati raj (India)
  - Body: Gram panchayat

Population (2011)
  - Total: 180
- Sex ratio 101/79♂/♀

Languages
  - Official: Punjabi
  - Other spoken: Hindi
- Time zone: UTC+5:30 (IST)
- PIN: 144408
- Telephone code: 01822
- ISO 3166 code: IN-PB
- Vehicle registration: PB-09
- Website: kapurthala.gov.in

Tanda Bhagana is a village in Phagwara Tehsil in Kapurthala district of Punjab State, India. It is located 56 kilometres (35 mi) from Kapurthala, 22 kilometres (14 mi) from Phagwara. The village is administrated by a Sarpanch who is an elected representative of village.

== Transport ==
Phagwara Junction Railway Station, Mauli Halt Railway Station are nearby railway stations to Tanda Bhagana. Jalandhar City Rail Way station is 23 km away from the village. The village is 118 km away from Sri Guru Ram Dass Jee International Airport in Amritsar. Another nearby airport is Sahnewal Airport in Ludhiana which is located 40 km away from the village.
