= Talwandi Rajputan =

- Village
- Location in Punjab, India Talwandi Rajputan (India)
- Coordinates: 31.437778°N 75.272652°E
- Country: India
- State: Punjab
- District: Kapurthala

Government
  - Type: Panchayati raj (India)
  - Body: Gram panchayat

Population (2011)
  - Total: 237
- Sex ratio 121/116♂/♀

Languages
  - Official: Punjabi
  - Other spoken: Hindi
- Time zone: UTC+5:30 (IST)
- PIN: 144601
- Telephone code: 01822
- ISO 3166 code: IN-PB
- Vehicle registration: PB-09
- Website: kapurthala.gov.in

Talwandi Rajputan is a village in Kapurthala district of Punjab State, India. It is located 14 kilometres (8.7 mi) from Kapurthala, which is both district and sub-district headquarters of Talwandi Rajputan. The village is administrated by a Sarpanch, who is an elected representative.

== Demography ==
According to the report published by Census India in 2011, Talwandi Rajputan has total number of 47 houses and population of 237 of which include 121 males and 116 females. Literacy rate of Talwandi Rajputan is 71.56%, lower than state average of 75.84%. The population of children under the age of 6 years is 19 which is 8.02% of total population of Talwandi Rajputan, and child sex ratio is approximately 583, lower than state average of 846.

== Population data ==
Particulars	Total	Male	Female
Total No. of Houses	47	-	-
Total Population	237	121	116
In the age group 0–6 years	19	12	7
Scheduled Castes (SC)	138	71	67
Scheduled Tribes (ST)	0	0	0
Literates	156	84	72
Illiterate	81	37	44
Total Worker	59	57	2
Main Worker	59	57	2
Marginal Worker	0	0	0
