= Kamewal =

- Village
- Location in Punjab, India Kamewal (India)
- Coordinates: 31.423541°N 75.228945°E
- Country: India
- State: Punjab
- District: Kapurthala

Government
  - Type: Panchayati raj (India)
  - Body: Gram panchayat

Population (2011)
  - Total: 132
- Sex ratio 64/68♂/♀

Languages
  - Official: Punjabi
  - Other spoken: Hindi
- Time zone: UTC+5:30 (IST)
- PIN: 144621
- Telephone code: 01822
- ISO 3166 code: IN-PB
- Vehicle registration: PB-09
- Website: kapurthala.gov.in

Kamewal is a village in Kapurthala district of Punjab State, India. It is located 22 kilometres (14 mi) from Kapurthala, which is both district and sub-district headquarters of Kamewal. The village is administrated by a Sarpanch who is an elected representative.

== Demography ==
According to the report published by Census India in 2011, Kamewal has 26 houses with the total population of 132 persons of which 64 are male and 68 females. Literacy rate of Kamewal is 63.96%, lower than the state average of 75.84%. The population of children in the age group 0–6 years is 21 which is 15.91% of the total population. Child sex ratio is approximately 1100, higher than the state average of 846.

== Population data ==
Particulars	Total	Male	Female
Total No. of Houses	26	-	-
Population	132	64	68
Child (0-6)	21	10	11
Schedule Caste	75	35	40
Schedule Tribe	0	0	0
Literacy	63.96 %	72.22 %	56.14 %
Total Workers	44	40	4
Main Worker	42	0	0
Marginal Worker	2	1	1
