= Saidowal, Kapurthala =

Saidowal
- Village
- Location in Punjab, India Saidowal (India)
- Coordinates: 31.320063°N 75.369273°E
- Country: India
- State: Punjab
- District: Kapurthala

Government
  - Type: Panchayati raj (India)
  - Body: Gram panchayat

Population (2011)
  - Total: 1,786
- Sex ratio 899/887♂/♀

Languages
  - Official: Punjabi
  - Other spoken: Hindi
- Time zone: UTC+5:30 (IST)
- PIN: 144620
- Telephone code: 01822
- ISO 3166 code: IN-PB
- Vehicle registration: PB-09
- Website: kapurthala.gov.in

Saidowal is a village in Kapurthala district of Punjab State, India. It is located 8 kilometres (5.0 mi) from Kapurthala, which is both district and sub-district headquarters of Saidowal. The village is administrated by a Sarpanch, who is an elected representative.

== Demography ==
According to the report published by Census India in 2011, Saidowal has 385 houses with the total population of 1,786 persons of which 899 are male and 887 females. Literacy rate of Saidowal is 77.91%, higher than the state average of 75.84%. The population of children in the age group 0–6 years is 143 which is 8.01% of the total population. Child sex ratio is approximately 959, higher than the state average of 846.

== Population data ==
Particulars	Total	Male	Female
Total No. of Houses	385	-	-
Population	1,786	899	887
Child (0-6)	143	73	70
Schedule Caste	498	269	229
Schedule Tribe	0	0	0
Literacy	77.91 %	82.20 %	73.56 %
Total Workers	621	502	119
Main Worker	528	0	0
Marginal Worker	93	56	37
