= Budha Theh, Kapurthala =

Budha Theh
- Village
- Location in Punjab, India Budha Theh (India)
- Coordinates: 31.525797°N 75.303317°E
- Country: India
- State: Punjab
- District: Kapurthala

Government
  - Type: Panchayati raj (India)
  - Body: Gram panchayat

Population (2011)
  - Total: 477
- Sex ratio 246/231♂/♀

Languages
  - Official: Punjabi
  - Other spoken: Hindi
- Time zone: UTC+5:30 (IST)
- PIN: 144804
- Telephone code: 01822
- ISO 3166 code: IN-PB
- Vehicle registration: PB-09
- Website: kapurthala.gov.in

Budha Theh is a village in Kapurthala district of Punjab State, India. It is located 20 kilometres (12 mi) from Kapurthala, which is both district and sub-district headquarters of Budha Theh. The village is administrated by a Sarpanch who is an elected representative of village as per the constitution of India and Panchayati raj (India).

== Demography ==
According to the report published by Census India in 2011, Budha Theh has a total number of 91 houses and population of 477 of which include 246 males and 231 females. Literacy rate of Budha Theh is 74.51%, lower than state average of 75.84%. The population of children under the age of 6 years is 65 which is 13.63% of total population of Budha Theh, and child sex ratio is approximately 1031, higher than state average of 846.

== Population data ==
Particulars	Total	Male	Female
Total No. of Houses	91	-	-
Population	477	246	231
Child (0–6)	65	32	33
Schedule Caste	155	76	79
Schedule Tribe	0	0	0
Literacy	74.51 %	75.23 %	73.74 %
Total Workers	176	135	41
Main Worker	122	0	0
Marginal Worker	54	37	17

== Air travel connectivity ==
The closest airport to the village is Sri Guru Ram Dass Jee International Airport.
