= Budo Punder =

- Village
- Location in Punjab, India Budo Punder (India)
- Coordinates: 31.343536°N 75.466516°E
- Country: India
- State: Punjab
- District: Kapurthala

Government
  - Type: Panchayati raj (India)
  - Body: Gram panchayat

Population (2011)
  - Total: 143
- Sex ratio 76/67♂/♀

Languages
  - Official: Punjabi
  - Other spoken: Hindi
- Time zone: UTC+5:30 (IST)
- PIN: 144601
- Telephone code: 01822
- ISO 3166 code: IN-PB
- Vehicle registration: PB-09
- Website: kapurthala.gov.in

Budo Punder is a village in Kapurthala district of Punjab State, India. It is located 8 kilometres (5.0 mi) from Kapurthala, which is both district and sub-district headquarters of Budo Punder. The village is administrated by a Sarpanch, who is an elected representative.

== Demography ==
According to the report published by Census India in 2011, Budo Punder has a total number of 29 houses and population of 143 of which include 76 males and 67 females. Literacy rate of Budo Punder is 85.51%, higher than state average of 75.84%. The population of children under the age of 6 years is 5 which is 3.50% of total population of Budo Punder, and child sex ratio is approximately 667, lower than state average of 846.

== Population data ==
Particulars	Total	Male	Female
Total No. of Houses	29	-	-
Population	143	76	67
Child (0–6)	5	3	2
Schedule Caste	0	0	0
Schedule Tribe	0	0	0
Literacy	85.51 %	87.67 %	83.08 %
Total Workers	95	49	46
Main Worker	79	0	0
Marginal Worker	16	9	7

== Air travel connectivity ==
The closest airport to the village is Sri Guru Ram Dass Jee International Airport.
