= Mansurwal Bet =

- Village
- Location in Punjab, India Mansurwal Bet (India)
- Coordinates: 31.522788°N 75.373281°E
- Country: India
- State: Punjab
- District: Kapurthala

Government
  - Type: Panchayati raj (India)
  - Body: Gram panchayat

Population (2011)
  - Total: 908
- Sex ratio 475/433♂/♀

Languages
  - Official: Punjabi
  - Other spoken: Hindi
- Time zone: UTC+5:30 (IST)
- PIN: 144804
- Telephone code: 01822
- ISO 3166 code: IN-PB
- Vehicle registration: PB-09
- Website: kapurthala.gov.in

Mansurwal Bet is a village in Kapurthala district of Punjab State, India. It is located 25 kilometres (16 mi) from Kapurthala, which is both district and sub-district headquarters of Mansurwal Bet. The village is administrated by a Sarpanch, who is an elected representative.

== Demography ==
According to the report published by Census India in 2011, Mansurwal Bet has 193 houses with the total population of 908 persons of which 475 are male and 433 females. Literacy rate of Mansurwal Bet is 69.82%, lower than the state average of 75.84%. The population of children in the age group 0–6 years is 93 which is 10.24% of the total population. Child sex ratio is approximately 603, lower than the state average of 846.

== Population data ==
Particulars	Total	Male	Female
Total No. of Houses	193	-	-
Population	908	475	433
Child (0–6)	93	58	35
Schedule Caste	5	3	2
Schedule Tribe	0	0	0
Literacy	69.82 %	72.42 %	67.09 %
Total Workers	273	258	15
Main Worker	271	0	0
Marginal Worker	2	2	0
