= Karahal Nauabad =

- Village
- Location in Punjab, India Karahal Nauabad (India)
- Coordinates: 31.273821°N 75.287279°E
- Country: India
- State: Punjab
- District: Kapurthala

Government
  - Type: Panchayati raj (India)
  - Body: Gram panchayat

Population (2011)
  - Total: 662
- Sex ratio 339/323♂/♀

Languages
  - Official: Punjabi
  - Other spoken: Hindi
- Time zone: UTC+5:30 (IST)
- PIN: 144620
- Telephone code: 01822
- ISO 3166 code: IN-PB
- Vehicle registration: PB-09
- Website: kapurthala.gov.in

Karahal Nauabad is a village in Kapurthala district of Punjab State, India. It is located 18 kilometres (11 mi) from Kapurthala, which is both district and sub-district headquarters of Karahal Nauabad. The village is administered by a Sarpanch, who is an elected representative.

== Demography ==
According to the report published by Census India in 2011, Karahal Nauabad has 130 houses with the total population of 662 persons of which 339 are male and 323 females. Literacy rate of Karahal Nauabad is 75.58%, lower than the state average of 75.84%. The population of children in the age group 0–6 years is 56 which is 8.46% of the total population. Child sex ratio is approximately 1000, higher than the state average of 846.

== Population data ==
Particulars	Total	Male	Female
Total No. of Houses	130	-	-
Population	662	339	323
Child (0-6)	56	28	28
Schedule Caste	217	107	110
Schedule Tribe	0	0	0
Literacy	75.58 %	80.39 %	70.51 %
Total Workers	255	212	43
Main Worker	245	0	0
Marginal Worker	10	3	7
