= Bhagana =

- Village
- Location in Punjab, India Bhagana (India)
- Coordinates: 30°36′01″N 76°34′30″E
- Country: India
- State: Punjab
- District: Kapurthala
- Tehsil: Phagwara

Government
  - Type: Panchayat raj
  - Body: Gram panchayat

Area
  - Total: 732 ha (1,810 acres)

Population (2011)
  - Total: 2,839; 1,493/1,346 ♂/♀
  - Scheduled Castes: 1,469; 781/688 ♂/♀
  - Total Households: 593

Languages
  - Official: Punjabi
- Time zone: UTC+5:30 (IST)
- ISO 3166 code: IN-PB
- Website: kapurthala.gov.in

Bhagana is a village in Phagwara in Kapurthala district of Punjab State, India. It is located 15 kilometres (9.3 mi) from sub district headquarter and 63 kilometres (39 mi) from district headquarter. The village is administrated by Sarpanch an elected representative of the village.

== Demography ==
As of 2011, The village has a total number of 593 houses and the population of 2839 of which 1493 are males while 1346 are females. According to the report published by Census India in 2011, out of the total population of the village 1469 people are from Schedule Caste and the village does not have any Schedule Tribe population so far.

== See also ==
- List of villages in India
