= Kirpalpur =

- Village
- Location in Punjab, India Kirpalpur (India)
- Coordinates: 31.200029°N 75.718250°E
- Country: India
- State: Punjab
- District: Kapurthala

Government
  - Type: Panchayati raj (India)
  - Body: Gram panchayat

Population (2011)
  - Total: 312
- Sex ratio 151/161♂/♀

Languages
  - Official: Punjabi
  - Other spoken: Hindi
- Time zone: UTC+5:30 (IST)
- PIN: 144401
- Telephone code: 01822
- ISO 3166 code: IN-PB
- Vehicle registration: PB-09
- Website: kapurthala.gov.in

Kirpalpur is a village in Tehsil Phagwara, Kapurthala district, in Punjab, India. It is located 3 kilometres (1.9 mi) away from sub-district headquarter Phagwara and 52 km away from district headquarter Kapurthala and 129 kilometres (80 mi)from State capital Chandigarh. The village is administrated by a Sarpanch, who is an elected representative of village.

== Transport ==
Phagwara Junction and Mauli Halt are the closest railway stations to Kirpalpur; Jalandhar City railway station is 23 km (14 mi) distant. The village is 118 km away from Sri Guru Ram Dass Jee International Airport in Amritsar and the nearest airport is Sahnewal Airport in Ludhiana which is located 40 km away from the village.
