= Lakhan Khurd =

- Village
- Location in Punjab, India Lakhan Khurd (India)
- Coordinates: 31.435667°N 75.436196°E
- Country: India
- State: Punjab
- District: Kapurthala

Government
  - Type: Panchayati raj (India)
  - Body: Gram panchayat

Population (2011)
  - Total: 1,170
- Sex ratio 610/560♂/♀

Languages
  - Official: Punjabi
  - Other spoken: Hindi
- Time zone: UTC+5:30 (IST)
- PIN: 144601
- Telephone code: 01822
- ISO 3166 code: IN-PB
- Vehicle registration: PB-09
- Website: kapurthala.gov.in

Lakhan Khurd is a village in Kapurthala district of Punjab State, India. Khurd is Persian language word which means small. It is located 9 kilometres (5.6 mi) from Kapurthala, which is both district and sub-district headquarters of Lakhan Khurd. The village is administrated by a Sarpanch, who is an elected representative.

== Demography ==
According to the report published by Census India in 2011, Lakhan Khurd has total number of 224 houses and population of 1,170 of which include 610 males and 560 females. Literacy rate of Lakhan Khurd is 72.59%, lower than state average of 75.84%. The population of children under the age of 6 years is 134 which is 11.45% of total population of GobinLakhan Khurddpur, and child sex ratio is approximately 811, lower than state average of 846.

== Population data ==
Particulars	Total	Male	Female
Total No. of Houses	224	-	-
Population	1,170	610	560
Child (0-6)	134	74	60
Schedule Caste	452	232	220
Schedule Tribe	0	0	0
Literacy	72.59 %	77.99 %	66.80 %
Total Workers	339	327	12
Main Worker	331	0	0
Marginal Worker	8	6	2

== Air travel connectivity ==
The closest airport to the village is Sri Guru Ram Dass Jee International Airport.
