= Mander Dona =

- Village
- Location in Punjab, India Mander Dona (India)
- Coordinates: 31.269668°N 75.408251°E
- Country: India
- State: Punjab
- District: Kapurthala

Government
  - Type: Panchayati raj (India)
  - Body: Gram panchayat

Population (2011)
  - Total: 200
- Sex ratio 99/101♂/♀

Languages
  - Official: Punjabi
  - Other spoken: Hindi
- Time zone: UTC+5:30 (IST)
- PIN: 144625
- Telephone code: 01822
- ISO 3166 code: IN-PB
- Vehicle registration: PB-09
- Website: kapurthala.gov.in

Mander Dona is a village in Kapurthala district of Punjab State, India. It is located 16 kilometres (9.9 mi) from Kapurthala, which is both district and sub-district headquarters of Mander Dona. The village is administrated by a Sarpanch, who is an elected representative.

== Demography ==
According to the report published by Census India in 2011, Mander Dona has 37 houses with the total population of 200 persons of which 99 are male and 101 females. Literacy rate of Mander Dona is 79.33%, higher than the state average of 75.84%. The population of children in the age group 0–6 years is 21 which is 10.50% of the total population. Child sex ratio is approximately 1100, higher than the state average of 846.

== Population data ==
Particulars	Total	Male	Female
Total No. of Houses	37	-	-
Population	200	99	101
Child (0-6)	21	10	11
Schedule Caste	55	31	24
Schedule Tribe	0	0	0
Literacy	79.33 %	80.90 %	77.78 %
Total Workers	58	46	12
Main Worker	57	0	0
Marginal Worker	1	1	0
