= Malian, Kapurthala =

Nano Mallian
- Village
- Location in Punjab, India Nano Mallian (India)
- Coordinates: 31.263099°N 75.303317°E
- Country: India
- State: Punjab
- District: Kapurthala

Government
  - Type: Panchayati raj (India)
  - Body: Gram panchayat

Population (2011)
  - Total: 865
- Sex ratio 433/432♂/♀

Languages
  - Official: Punjabi
  - Other spoken: Hindi
- Time zone: UTC+5:30 (IST)
- PIN: 144620
- Telephone code: 01822
- ISO 3166 code: IN-PB
- Vehicle registration: PB-09

Nano Mallian is a village in Kapurthala district of Punjab State, India. It is located 16 kilometres (9.9 mi) from Kapurthala, which is both district and sub-district headquarters of Nano Mallian. The village is administrated by a Sarpanch who is an elected representative of village as per the constitution of India and Panchayati raj (India).

== Demography ==
According to the report published by Census India in 2011, Malian has 177 houses with the total population of 865 persons of which 433 are male and 432 females. Literacy rate of Malian is 75.68%, lower than the state average of 75.84%. The population of children in the age group 0–6 years is 88 which is 10.17% of the total population. Child sex ratio is approximately 1146, higher than the state average of 846.

== Population data ==
Particulars	Total	Male	Female
Total No. of Houses	177	-	-
Population	865	433	432
Child (0–6)	88	41	47
Schedule Caste	457	227	230
Schedule Tribe	0	0	0
Literacy	75.68 %	82.65 %	68.57 %
Total Workers	461	286	175
Main Worker	438	0	0
Marginal Worker	23	12	11
