= Baghana =

- Village
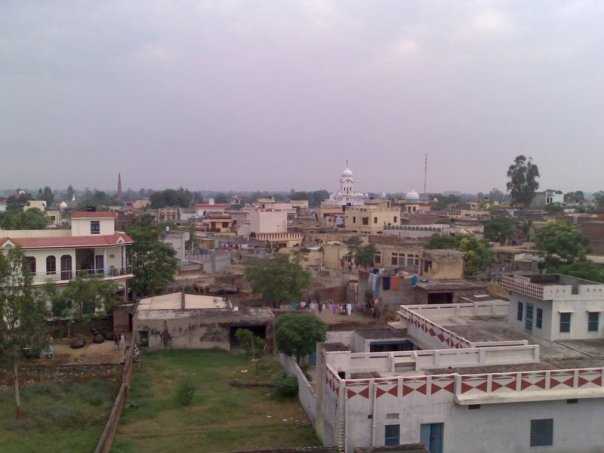

- Location in Punjab, India Baghana (India)
- Coordinates: 31°21′0″N 75°50′0″E
- Country: India
- State: Punjab
- District: Kapurthala

Population
  - Total: 5,000 Plus

Languages
  - Official: Punjabi
- Time zone: UTC+5:30 (IST)
- PIN: 144405
- Telephone code: 01824
- Vehicle registration: PB-36
- Coastline: 0 kilometres (0 mi)
- Nearest city: Phagwara
- Literacy: 90 %%
- Lok Sabha constituency: Hoshiarpur
- Avg. summer temperature: 45 °C (113 °F)
- Avg. winter temperature: 0–15 °C (32–59 °F)

Baghana is a village and gram panchayat located near Phagwara in Kapurthala District, Punjab, India.
