= Nazampur =

- Village
- Location in Punjab, India Nazampur (India)
- Coordinates: 31.454866°N 75.377652°E
- Country: India
- State: Punjab
- District: Kapurthala

Government
  - Type: Panchayati raj (India)
  - Body: Gram panchayat

Population (2011)
  - Total: 365
- Sex ratio 204/161♂/♀

Languages
  - Official: Punjabi
  - Other spoken: Hindi
- Time zone: UTC+5:30 (IST)
- PIN: 144602
- Telephone code: 01822
- ISO 3166 code: IN-PB
- Vehicle registration: PB-09
- Website: kapurthala.gov.in

Nazampur is a village in Kapurthala district of Punjab State, India. It is located 10 kilometres (6.2 mi) from Kapurthala, which is both district and sub-district headquarters of Nazampur. The village is administrated by a Sarpanch, who is an elected representative.

== Demography ==
According to the report published by Census India in 2011, Nazampur has 65 houses with the total population of 365 persons of which 204 are male and 161 females. Literacy rate of Nazampur is 89.44%, higher than the state average of 75.84%. The population of children in the age group 0–6 years is 24 which is 6.58% of the total population. Child sex ratio is approximately 1000, higher than the state average of 846.

== Population data ==
Particulars	Total	Male	Female
Total No. of Houses	65	-	-
Population	365	204	161
Child (0–6)	24	12	12
Schedule Caste	27	12	15
Schedule Tribe	0	0	0
Literacy	89.44 %	91.15 %	87.25 %
Total Workers	154	139	15
Main Worker	97	0	0
Marginal Worker	57	44	13

== Nearby villages ==
- Boot
- Paharipur
- Rupanpur
- Subhanpur
- Bajola
- Randhawa
- Shahpur Pira
- Hambowal
- Gaji Gudana
- Ghuluwal
- Fattu Chak
