= Gaji Gudana =

- Village
- Location in Punjab, India Gaji Gudana (India)
- Coordinates: 31.493506°N 75.361622°E
- Country: India
- State: Punjab
- District: Kapurthala

Government
  - Type: Panchayati raj (India)
  - Body: Gram panchayat

Population (2011)
  - Total: 400
- Sex ratio 197/203♂/♀

Languages
  - Official: Punjabi
  - Other spoken: Hindi
- Time zone: UTC+5:30 (IST)
- PIN: 144804
- Telephone code: 01822
- ISO 3166 code: IN-PB
- Vehicle registration: PB-09
- Website: kapurthala.gov.in

Gaji Gudana is a village in Kapurthala district of Punjab State, India. It is located 25 kilometres (16 mi) from Kapurthala, which is both district and sub-district headquarters of Gaji Gudana. The village is administrated by a Sarpanch, who is an elected representative.

== Demography ==
According to the report published by Census India in 2011, Gaji Gudana has a total number of 77 houses and population of 400 of which include 197 males and 203 females. Literacy rate of Gaji Gudana is 75.74%, lower than state average of 75.84%. The population of children under the age of 6 years is 29 which is 7.25% of total population of Gaji Gudana, and child sex ratio is approximately 1071, higher than state average of 846.

== Population data ==
Particulars	Total	Male	Female
Total No. of Houses	77	-	-
Population	400	197	203
Child (0-6)	29	14	15
Schedule Caste	0	0	0
Schedule Tribe	0	0	0
Literacy	75.74 %	83.06 %	68.62 %
Total Workers	117	100	17
Main Worker	112	0	0
Marginal Worker	5	3	2

== Air travel connectivity ==
The closest airport to the village is Sri Guru Ram Dass Jee International Airport.
