= Maheru, Phagwara =

Maheru
- Village
- Location in Punjab, India Maheru (India)
- Coordinates: 31.243268°N 75.685535°E
- Country: India
- State: Punjab
- District: Kapurthala

Government
  - Type: Panchayati raj (India)
  - Body: Gram panchayat

Population (2011)
  - Total: 1,704
- Sex ratio 884/820♂/♀

Languages
  - Official: Punjabi
  - Other spoken: Hindi
- Time zone: UTC+5:30 (IST)
- PIN: 144401
- Telephone code: 01822
- ISO 3166 code: IN-PB
- Vehicle registration: PB-09
- Website: kapurthala.gov.in

Maheru is a village in Phagwara Tehsil in Kapurthala district of Punjab State, India. It is located 42 kilometres (26 mi) from Kapurthala, 15 kilometres (9.3 mi) from Phagwara. The village is administrated by a Sarpanch who is an elected representative of village as per the constitution of India and Panchayati raj (India).

== Transport ==
Jamsher Khas and Chiheru are the very nearby railway stations to Maheru. Jalandhar City railway station is 13 kilometres (8.1 mi) from the village. The village is 108 kilometres (67 mi) from Sri Guru Ram Dass Jee International Airport in Amritsar, and the nearest airport is Sahnewal Airport in Ludhiana which is located 46 kilometres (29 mi) distant.
