= Ratta Nauabad =

- Village
- Location in Punjab, India Ratta Nauabad (India)
- Coordinates: 31.337177°N 75.314980°E
- Country: India
- State: Punjab
- District: Kapurthala

Government
  - Type: Panchayati raj (India)
  - Body: Gram panchayat

Population (2011)
  - Total: 328
- Sex ratio 164/164♂/♀

Languages
  - Official: Punjabi
  - Other spoken: Hindi
- Time zone: UTC+5:30 (IST)
- PIN: 144620
- Telephone code: 01822
- ISO 3166 code: IN-PB
- Vehicle registration: PB-09
- Website: kapurthala.gov.in

Ratta Nauabad is a village in Kapurthala district of Punjab State, India. It is located 7 kilometres (4.3 mi) from Kapurthala, which is both district and sub-district headquarters of Ratta Nauabad. The village is administrated by a Sarpanch who is an elected representative of village as per the constitution of India and Panchayati raj (India).

== Demography ==
According to the report published by Census India in 2011, Ratta Nauabad has 60 houses with the total population of 328 persons of which 164 are male and 164 females. Literacy rate of Ratta Nauabad is 76.17%, higher than the state average of 75.84%. The population of children in the age group 0–6 years is 51 which is 15.55% of the total population. Child sex ratio is approximately 962, higher than the state average of 846.

== Population data ==
Particulars	Total	Male	Female
Total No. of Houses	60	-	-
Population	328	164	164
Child (0-6)	51	26	25
Schedule Caste	152	75	77
Schedule Tribe	0	0	0
Literacy	76.17 %	81.88 %	70.50 %
Total Workers	101	87	14
Main Worker	101	0	0
Marginal Worker	0	0	0
