= Muradpur Dona =

- Village
- Location in Punjab, India Muradpur Dona (India)
- Coordinates: 31.256233°N 75.455593°E
- Country: India
- State: Punjab
- District: Kapurthala

Government
  - Type: Panchayati raj (India)
  - Body: Gram panchayat

Population (2011)
  - Total: 15
- Sex ratio 7/8♂/♀

Languages
  - Official: Punjabi
  - Other spoken: Hindi
- Time zone: UTC+5:30 (IST)
- PIN: 144623
- Telephone code: 01822
- ISO 3166 code: IN-PB
- Vehicle registration: PB-09
- Website: kapurthala.gov.in

Muradpur Dona is a village in Kapurthala district of Punjab State, India. It is located 16 kilometres (9.9 mi) from Kapurthala, which is both district and sub-district headquarters of Muradpur Dona. The village is administrated by a Sarpanch who is an elected representative of village as per the constitution of India and Panchayati raj (India).

== Demography ==
According to the report published by Census India in 2011, Muradpur Dona has 4 houses with the total population of 15 persons of which 7 are male and 8 females. Literacy rate of Muradpur Dona is 66.67%, lower than the state average of 75.84%. The population of children in the age group 0–6 years is 0 which is 0.00% of the total population. Child sex ratio is 0, lower than the state average of 846.

== Population data ==
Particulars	Total	Male	Female
Total No. of Houses	4	-	-
Population	15	7	8
Child (0–6)	0	0	0
Schedule Caste	0	0	0
Schedule Tribe	0	0	0
Literacy	66.67 %	71.43 %	62.50 %
Total Workers	4	4	0
Main Worker	4	0	0
Marginal Worker	0	0	0
