= Mangaroda =

- Village
- Location in Punjab, India Mangaroda (India)
- Coordinates: 31.314169°N 75.345591°E
- Country: India
- State: Punjab
- District: Kapurthala

Government
  - Type: Panchayati raj (India)
  - Body: Gram panchayat

Population (2011)
  - Total: 466
- Sex ratio 253/213♂/♀

Languages
  - Official: Punjabi
  - Other spoken: Hindi
- Time zone: UTC+5:30 (IST)
- PIN: 144602
- Telephone code: 01822
- ISO 3166 code: IN-PB
- Vehicle registration: PB-09
- Website: kapurthala.gov.in

Mangaroda is a village in Kapurthala district of Punjab State, India. It is located 10 kilometres (6.2 mi) from Kapurthala, which is both district and sub-district headquarters of Mangaroda. The village is administrated by a Sarpanch, who is an elected representative.

== Demography ==
According to the report published by Census India in 2011, Mangaroda has 105 houses with the total population of 466 persons of which 253 are male and 213 females. Literacy rate of Mangaroda is 78.45%, higher than the state average of 75.84%. The population of children in the age group 0–6 years is 53 which is 11.37% of the total population. Child sex ratio is approximately 514, lower than the state average of 846.

== Population data ==
Particulars	Total	Male	Female
Total No. of Houses	105	-	-
Population	466	253	213
Child (0-6)	53	35	18
Schedule Caste	191	102	89
Schedule Tribe	0	0	0
Literacy	78.45 %	82.57 %	73.85 %
Total Workers	155	131	24
Main Worker	145	0	0
Marginal Worker	10	2	8
