= Jhal Bibri =

- Village
- Location in Punjab, India Jhal Bibri (India)
- Coordinates: 31.332708°N 75.318624°E
- Country: India
- State: Punjab
- District: Kapurthala

Government
  - Type: Panchayati raj (India)
  - Body: Gram panchayat

Population (2011)
  - Total: 357
- Sex ratio 188/169♂/♀

Languages
  - Official: Punjabi
  - Other spoken: Hindi
- Time zone: UTC+5:30 (IST)
- PIN: 144620
- Telephone code: 01822
- ISO 3166 code: IN-PB
- Vehicle registration: PB-09
- Website: kapurthala.gov.in

Jhal Bibri is a village in Kapurthala district of Punjab State, India. It is located 10 kilometres (6.2 mi) from Kapurthala, which is both district and sub-district headquarters of Jhal Bibri. The village is administrated by a Sarpanch, who is an elected representative.

== Demography ==
According to the report published by Census India in 2011, Jhal Bibri has 66 houses with the total population of 357 persons of which 188 are male and 169 females. Literacy rate of Jhal Bibri is 79.69%, higher than the state average of 75.84%. The population of children in the age group 0–6 years is 37 which is 10.36% of the total population. Child sex ratio is approximately 762, lower than the state average of 846.

== Population data ==
Particulars	Total	Male	Female
Total No. of Houses	66	-	-
Population	357	188	169
Child (0-6)	37	21	16
Schedule Caste	47	26	21
Schedule Tribe	0	0	0
Literacy	79.69 %	85.63 %	73.20 %
Total Workers	117	111	6
Main Worker	111	0	0
Marginal Worker	6	2	4
