= Ranipur Kamboan =

- Village
- Location in Punjab, India Ranipur Kamboan (India)
- Coordinates: 31.371480°N 75.393681°E
- Country: India
- State: Punjab
- District: Kapurthala

Government
  - Type: Panchayati raj (India)
  - Body: Gram panchayat

Population (2011)
  - Total: 2,384
- Sex ratio 1239/1145♂/♀

Languages
  - Official: Punjabi
  - Other spoken: Hindi
- Time zone: UTC+5:30 (IST)
- PIN: 144401
- Telephone code: 01822
- ISO 3166 code: IN-PB
- Vehicle registration: PB-09
- Website: kapurthala.gov.in

Ranipur Kamboan is a village in Phagwara Tehsil in Kapurthala district of Punjab State, India. It is located 45 kilometres (28 mi) from Kapurthala, 12 kilometres (7.5 mi) from Phagwara. The village is administrated by a Sarpanch, Jasvir Kaur Chandi, who is an elected representative.

== Transport ==
Bolinna Doaba Railway Station, Chiheru Railway Station are the nearby railway stations to Ranipur Kamboan. Jalandhar City Rail Way station is 16 km away from the village. The village is 111 km away from Sri Guru Ram Dass Jee International Airport in Amritsar. Another neareby airport is Sahnewal Airport in Ludhiana which is located 51 km away from the village.
