= Alaudi =

- Village
- Location in Punjab, India Alaudi (India)
- Coordinates: 31.332236°N 75.453408°E
- Country: India
- State: Punjab
- District: Kapurthala

Government
  - Type: Panchayati raj (India)
  - Body: Gram panchayat

Languages
  - Official: Punjabi
  - Other spoken: Hindi
- Time zone: UTC+5:30 (IST)
- Telephone code: 01822
- ISO 3166 code: IN-PB
- Vehicle registration: PB-09
- Website: kapurthala.gov.in

Alaudi is a village located in Kapurthala district, Punjab.

== Demography ==
As per Population Census 2011, the Alaudi village has population of 147 of which 74 are males while 73 are females. The village is administrated by Sarpanch an elected representative of the village. Literacy rate of Alaudi is 78.79%, higher than state average of 75.84%. The population of children under the age of 6 years is 15 which is 10.20% of total population of Alaudi, and child sex ratio is approximately 986 higher than Punjab average of 846.

== Population data ==
| Particulars | Total | Male | Female |
|---|---|---|---|
| Total No. of Houses | 28 | - | - |
| Population | 147 | 74 | 73 |
| Child (0–6) | 15 | 5 | 10 |
| Schedule Caste | 134 | 69 | 65 |
| Schedule Tribe | 0 | 0 | 0 |
| Literacy | 78.79 % | 89.86 % | 66.67 % |
| Total Workers | 94 | 50 | 44 |
| Main Worker | 83 | 0 | 0 |
| Marginal Worker | 11 | 4 | 7 |
