= Drawesh Pind =

Darvesh Pind
- Village
- Location in Punjab, India Darvesh Pind (India)
- Coordinates: 31.207704°N 75.699349°E
- Country: India
- State: Punjab
- District: Kapurthala

Government
  - Type: Panchayati raj (India)
  - Body: Gram panchayat

Population (2011)
  - Total: 1,891
- Sex ratio 957/934♂/♀

Languages
  - Official: Punjabi
  - Other spoken: Hindi
- Time zone: UTC+5:30 (IST)
- PIN: 144402
- Telephone code: 01824
- ISO 3166 code: IN-PB
- Vehicle registration: PB-09 | PB-36
- Website: kapurthala.gov.in

Darvesh Pind is a village in Phagwara Tehsil in Kapurthala district of Punjab State, India. It is located 57 kilometres (35 mi) from Kapurthala, 7 kilometres (4.3 mi) from Phagwara. The village is administrated by a Sarpanch, who is an elected representative.

== Demography ==
According to the report published by Census India in 2011, Drawesh Pind has 381 houses with the total population of 1,891 persons of which 957 are male and 934 females. Literacy rate of Drawesh Pind is 71.26%, lower than the state average of 75.84%. The population of children in the age group 0–6 years is 193 which is 10.21% of the total population. Child sex ratio is approximately 930, higher than the state average of 846.

== Population data ==
Particulars	Total	Male	Female
Total No. of Houses	381	-	-
Population	1,891	957	934
Child (0–6)	193	100	93
Schedule Caste	1,261	639	622
Schedule Tribe	0	0	0
Literacy	71.26 %	75.38 %	67.06 %
Total Workers	677	566	111
Main Worker	357	0	0
Marginal Worker	320	262	58

As per census 2011, 677 people were engaged in work activities out of the total population of Drawesh Pind village which includes 566 males and 111 females. According to census survey report 2011, 52.73% workers (Employment or Earning more than 6 Months) describe their work as main work and 47.27% workers are involved in Marginal activity providing livelihood for less than 6 months.

== Caste ==
The village has schedule caste (SC) constitutes 66.68% of total population of the village and it does not have any Schedule Tribe (ST) population.
