= Bishanpur =

- Village
- Location in Punjab, India Bishanpur (India)
- Coordinates: 31.230775°N 75.820348°E
- Country: India
- State: Punjab
- District: Kapurthala

Government
  - Type: Panchayati raj (India)
  - Body: Gram panchayat

Population (2011)
  - Total: 1,479
- Sex ratio 732/747♂/♀

Languages
  - Official: Punjabi
  - Other spoken: Hindi
- Time zone: UTC+5:30 (IST)
- PIN: 144601
- Telephone code: 01822
- ISO 3166 code: IN-PB
- Vehicle registration: PB-09
- Website: kapurthala.gov.in

Bishanpur is a village in Kapurthala district of Punjab State, India. It is located 2 kilometres (1.2 mi) from Kapurthala, which is both district and sub-district headquarters of Bishanpur. The village is administrated by a Sarpanch who is an elected representative of village as per the constitution of India and Panchayati raj (India).

== Demography ==
According to the report published by Census India in 2011, Bishanpur has a total number of 292 houses and population of 1,479 of which include 732 males and 747 females. Literacy rate of Bishanpur is 78.74%, higher than state average of 75.84%. The population of children under the age of 6 years is 157 which is 10.62% of total population of Bishanpur, and child sex ratio is approximately 1039, higher than state average of 846.

== Population data ==
Particulars	Total	Male	Female
Total No. of Houses	292	-	-
Population	1,479	732	747
Child (0–6)	157	77	80
Schedule Caste	524	271	253
Schedule Tribe	0	0	0
Literacy	78.74 %	83.82 %	73.76 %
Total Workers	437	384	53
Main Worker	310	0	0
Marginal Worker	127	112	15

== Air travel connectivity ==
The closest airport to the village is Sri Guru Ram Dass Jee International Airport.
