= Nathu Chahal =

- Village
- Location in Punjab, India Nathu Chahal (India)
- Coordinates: 31.313761°N 75.402423°E
- Country: India
- State: Punjab
- District: Kapurthala

Government
  - Type: Panchayati raj (India)
  - Body: Gram panchayat

Population (2011)
  - Total: 2,000
- Sex ratio 741/701♂/♀

Languages
  - Official: Punjabi
  - Other spoken: Hindi
- Time zone: UTC+5:30 (IST)
- PIN: 144601
- Telephone code: 01822
- ISO 3166 code: IN-PB
- Vehicle registration: PB-09
- Website: kapurthala.gov.in

Nathu Chahal is a village in Kapurthala district of Punjab State, India. It is located 7 kilometres (4.3 mi) from Kapurthala, which is both district and sub-district headquarters of Nathu Chahal. The village is administrated by a Sarpanch, who is an elected representative.

== Demography ==
According to the report published by Census India in 2011, Nathu Chahal has total number of 302 houses and population of 1,442 of which include 741 males and 701 females. Literacy rate of Nathu Chahal is 79.61%, higher than state average of 75.84%. The population of children under the age of 6 years is 152 which is 10.54% of total population of Nathu Chahal, and child sex ratio is approximately 854, higher than state average of 846.

== Population data ==
Particulars	Total	Male	Female
Total No. of Houses	302	-	-
Population	1,442	741	701
Child (0-6)	152	82	70
Schedule Caste	362	192	170
Schedule Tribe	0	0	0
Literacy	79.61 %	83.16 %	75.91 %
Total Workers	429	386	43
Main Worker	418	0	0
Marginal Worker	11	8	3

== Air travel connectivity ==
The closest airport to the village is Sri Guru Ram Dass Jee International Airport.
