= Saprore =

- Village
- Location in Punjab, India Saprore (India)
- Coordinates: 31.371480°N 75.393681°E
- Country: India
- State: Punjab
- District: Kapurthala

Government
  - Type: Panchayati raj (India)
  - Body: Gram panchayat

Population (2011)
  - Total: 1,407
- Sex ratio 759/648♂/♀

Languages
  - Official: Punjabi
  - Other spoken: Hindi
- Time zone: UTC+5:30 (IST)
- PIN: 144401
- Telephone code: 01824
- ISO 3166 code: IN-PB
- Vehicle registration: PB-09
- Website: kapurthala.gov.in

Saprore is a village in Phagwara Tehsil in Kapurthala district of Punjab State, India. It is located 32 kilometres (20 mi) from Kapurthala, 6 kilometres (3.7 mi) from Phagwara. The village is administrated by a Sarpanch who is an elected representative of village as per the constitution of India and Panchayati raj (India).

== Transport ==
Phagwara Junction Railway Station, Chiheru Railway Station are the nearby railway stations. Jalandhar City railway station is 15 kilometres (9.3 mi) away. The village is 110 kilometres (68 mi) from Sri Guru Ram Dass Jee International Airport in Amritsar and the nearest airport is Sahnewal Airport in Ludhiana which is 47 kilometres (29 mi) from the village.
