= Nurpur Januhan =

- Village
- Location in Punjab, India Nurpur Januhan (India)
- Coordinates: 31.451559°N 75.295298°E
- Country: India
- State: Punjab
- District: Kapurthala

Government
  - Type: Panchayati raj (India)
  - Body: Gram panchayat

Population (2011)
  - Total: 707
- Sex ratio 358/349♂/♀

Languages
  - Official: Punjabi
  - Other spoken: Hindi
- Time zone: UTC+5:30 (IST)
- PIN: 144804
- Telephone code: 01822
- ISO 3166 code: IN-PB
- Vehicle registration: PB-09
- Website: kapurthala.gov.in

Nurpur Januhan is a village in Kapurthala district of Punjab State, India. It is located 14 kilometres (8.7 mi) from Kapurthala, which is both its district and sub-district headquarters. The village is administrated by a Sarpanch, who is an elected representative.

== Demography ==
According to the 2011 Census of India, Nurpur Januhan has total number of 131 houses and population of 707 of which include 358 males and 349 females. The Literacy rate of Nurpur Januhan is 72.61%, which is 3.23% lower than state average of 75.84%. The population of children under the age of 6 years is 79 which is 11.17% of total population of Nurpur Januhan, and child sex ratio is approximately 837, 9 lower than state average of 846.

== Air travel ==
The closest airport to the village is Sri Guru Ram Dass Jee International Airport.
