= Jalowal =

Jallowal
- Village
- Location in Punjab, India Jallowal (India)
- Coordinates: 31.242399°N 75.427442°E
- Country: India
- State: Punjab
- District: Kapurthala

Government
  - Type: Panchayati raj(India)
  - Body: Gram panchayat

Population (2011)
  - Total: 435
- Sex ratio 212/223♂/♀

Languages
  - Official: Punjabi
  - Other spoken: Hindi
- Time zone: UTC+5:30 (IST)
- PIN: 144623
- Telephone code: 01822
- ISO 3166 code: IN-PB
- Vehicle registration: PB-09
- Website: kapurthala.gov.in

Jallowal is a village in Kapurthala district of Punjab State, India. It is located 20 kilometres (12 mi) from Kapurthala, which is both district and sub-district headquarters of Jallowal. The village is administrated by a Sarpanch, who is an elected representative.( mostly Jatts).

== Demography ==
According to the report published by Census India in 2011, Jallowal has a total number of 85 houses and a population of 435 of which include 212 males and 223 females. Literacy rate of Jallowal is 68.60%, lower than the state average of 75.84%. The population of children under the age of 6 years is 56 which is 12.87% of the total population of Jallowal, and the child sex ratio is approximately 806, lower than the state average of 846.

== Population data ==
Particulars	Total	Male	Female
Total No. of Houses	85	-	-
Population	435	212	223
Child (0-6)	56	31	25
Schedule Caste	227	121	106
Schedule Tribe	0	0	0
Literacy	68.60 %	70.17 %	67.17 %
Total Workers	134	117	17
Main Worker	100	0	0
Marginal Worker	34	25	9

== Air travel connectivity ==
The closest airport to the village is Sri Guru Ram Dass Jee International Airport.
