= Nurpur Rajputan =

- Village
- Location in Punjab, India Nurpur Rajputan (India)
- Coordinates: 31.419515°N 75.349963°E
- Country: India
- State: Punjab
- District: Kapurthala

Government
  - Type: Panchayati raj (India)
  - Body: Gram panchayat

Population (2011)
  - Total: 442
- Sex ratio 239/203♂/♀

Languages
  - Official: Punjabi
  - Other spoken: Hindi
- Time zone: UTC+5:30 (IST)
- PIN: 144601
- Telephone code: 01822
- ISO 3166 code: IN-PB
- Vehicle registration: PB-09
- Website: kapurthala.gov.in

Nurpur Rajputan is a village in Kapurthala district of Punjab State, India. It is located 9 kilometres (5.6 mi) from Kapurthala, which is both district and sub-district headquarters of Nurpur Rajputan. The village is administrated by a Sarpanch, who is an elected representative.

== Demography ==
According to the report published by Census India in 2011, Nurpur Rajputan has a total number of 78 houses and a population of 442 of which include 239 males and 203 females. Literacy rate of Nurpur Rajputan is 68.00%, lower than the state average of 75.84%. The population of children under the age of 6 years is 42 which is 9.50% of the total population of Nurpur Rajputan, and the child sex ratio is approximately 826, lower than the state average of 846.

As per census 2011, 138 people were engaged in work activities out of the total population of Nurpur Rajputan which includes 129 males and 9 females. According to the census survey report 2011, 97.10% of workers describe their work as main work and 2.90% of workers are involved in Marginal activity providing a livelihood for less than 6 months.

== Population data ==
Particulars	Total	Male	Female
Total No. of Houses	78	-	-
Population	442	239	203
Child (0–6)	42	23	19
Schedule Caste	178	95	83
Schedule Tribe	0	0	0
Literacy	68.00 %	68.98 %	66.85 %
Total Workers	138	129	9
Main Worker	134	0	0
Marginal Worker	4	2	2

== Caste ==
The village has scheduled caste (SC) constitutes 40.27% of the total population of the village and it doesn't have any Schedule Tribe (ST) population.

== Air travel connectivity ==
The closest airport to the village is Sri Guru Ram Dass Jee International Airport.
