= Ahmadpur, Kapurthala =

Ahmadpur
- Village
- Location in Punjab, India Ahmadpur (India)
- Coordinates: 31.38345°N 75.32705°E
- Country: India
- State: Punjab
- District: Kapurthala

Government
  - Type: Panchayati raj (India)
  - Body: Gram panchayat

Languages
  - Official: Punjabi
  - Other spoken: Hindi
- Time zone: UTC+5:30 (IST)
- PIN: 144601
- Telephone code: 01822
- ISO 3166 code: IN-PB
- Vehicle registration: PB-09
- Website: kapurthala.gov.in

Ahmadpur is a village located in Kapurthala district, Punjab. It is located 12 kilometres (7.5 mi) from Kapurthala, which is both district and sub-district headquarters of Ahmadpur. The village is administered by a Sarpanch, who is an elected representative.

== Demography ==
As per Population Census 2011, the Ahmadpur village has population of 714 of which 360 are males while 354 are females. The village is administrated by Sarpanch an elected representative of the village. Literacy rate of Ahmadpur is 92.49%, higher than state average of 75.84% of Punjab. The population of children under the age of 6 years is 48 which is 6.72% of total population of Ahmadpur, and child sex ratio is approximately 714 lower than Punjab average of 846.

As per census 2011, 243 people were engaged in work activities out of the total population of Ahmadpur which includes 201 males and 42 females. According to census survey report 2011, 83.54% workers describe their work as main work and 16.46% workers are involved in Marginal activity providing livelihood for less than 6 months.

== Caste ==
The village has schedule caste (SC) constitutes 12.32% of total population of the village and it doesn't have any Schedule Tribe (ST) population.

== Population data ==
Particulars	Total	Male	Female
Total No. of Houses	151	-	-
Population	714	360	354
Child (0–6)	48	28	20
Schedule Caste	88	44	44
Schedule Tribe	0	0	0
Literacy	92.49 %	93.07 %	91.92 %
Total Workers	243	201	42
Main Worker	203	0	0
Marginal Worker	40	20	20
