= Nasirewal =

- Village
- Location in Punjab, India Nasirewal (India)
- Coordinates: 31.207843°N 75.267630°E
- Country: India
- State: Punjab
- District: Kapurthala

Government
  - Type: Panchayati raj (India)
  - Body: Gram panchayat

Languages
  - Official: Punjabi
  - Other spoken: Hindi
- Time zone: UTC+5:30 (IST)
- PIN: 144620
- Telephone code: 01822
- ISO 3166 code: IN-PB
- Vehicle registration: PB-09
- Website: kapurthala.gov.in

Nasirewal is a village in Sultanpur Lodhi tehsil in Kapurthala district of Punjab, India. It is located 6 kilometres (3.7 mi) from the city of Sultanpur Lodhi, 28 kilometres (17 mi) away from district headquarter Kapurthala. The village is administrated by a Sarpanch who is an elected representative of village as per the constitution of India and Panchayati raj (India). The current (2017) Sarpanch of the village is Balbir Singh. Lal Singh Dhaliwal, who is originally from this village, now lives in the city of Toronto in Canada.

== List of cities near the village ==
- Bhulath
- Kapurthala
- Phagwara
- Sultanpur Lodhi

== Air travel connectivity ==
The closest International airport to the village is Sri Guru Ram Dass Jee International Airport.
