= Ladwal =

- Village
- Location in Punjab, India Ladwal (India)
- Coordinates: 31.235255°N 75.147308°E
- Country: India
- State: Punjab
- District: Kapurthala

Government
  - Type: Panchayati raj (India)
  - Body: Gram panchayat

Languages
  - Official: Punjabi
  - Other spoken: Hindi
- Time zone: UTC+5:30 (IST)
- PIN: 144628
- Telephone code: 01822
- ISO 3166 code: IN-PB
- Vehicle registration: PB-09
- Website: kapurthala.gov.in

Ladwal is a village in Sultanpur Lodhi tehsil in Kapurthala district of Punjab, India. It is located 15 kilometres (9.3 mi) from the city of Sultanpur Lodhi, 20 kilometres (12 mi) away from district headquarter Kapurthala. The village is administrated by a Sarpanch who is an elected representative of village as per the constitution of India and Panchayati raj (India).

== Demography ==
According to the report published by Census India in 2011, Ladwal has a total number of 78 houses and population of 372 of which include 203 males and 169 females. Literacy rate of Ladwal is 75.22%, lower than state average of 75.84%. The population of children under the age of 6 years is 37 which is 9.95% of total population of Ladwal and child sex ratio is approximately 682, lower than state average of 846.

== Population data ==
Particulars	Total	Male	Female
Total No. of Houses	78	-	-
Population	372	203	169
Child (0-6)	37	22	15
Schedule Caste	124	66	58
Schedule Tribe	0	0	0
Literacy	75.22 %	82.32 %	66.88 %
Total Workers	127	124	3
Main Worker	124	0	0
Marginal Worker	3	3	0

== Caste ==
The village has schedule caste (SC) constitutes 33.33% of total population of the village and it doesn't have any Schedule Tribe (ST) population.

== Work profile ==
As per census 2011, 127 people were engaged in work activities out of the total population of Dhak Khalwara which includes 124 males and 3 females. According to census survey report 2011, 97.64% workers (Employment or Earning more than 6 Months) describe their work as main work and 2.36% workers are involved in Marginal activity providing livelihood for less than 6 months.

== Air travel connectivity ==
The closest airport to the village is Sri Guru Ram Dass Jee International Airport.

== List of cities near the village ==
- Bhulath
- Kapurthala
- Phagwara
- Sultanpur Lodhi

== Air travel connectivity ==
The closest International airport to the village is Sri Guru Ram Dass Jee International Airport.
