= Mand Bandu Jadid =

- Village
- Location in Punjab, India Mand Bandu Jadid (India)
- Coordinates: 31.247595°N 75.075716°E
- Country: India
- State: Punjab
- District: Kapurthala

Languages
  - Official: Punjabi
  - Other spoken: Hindi
- Time zone: UTC+5:30 (IST)
- PIN: 144626
- ISO 3166 code: IN-PB
- Vehicle registration: PB-09
- Website: kapurthala.gov.in

Mand Bandu Jadid is a village in Sultanpur Lodhi tehsil in the Kapurthala district of Punjab, India. Jadid is the Arabic word for new. It is located 16 kilometres (9.9 mi) from the city of Sultanpur Lodhi, 38 kilometres (24 mi) from the district headquarters of Kapurthala. The village is administrated by a Sarpanch, who is an elected representative of village as per the constitution of India and the Panchayati raj system.

== List of cities near the village ==
- Bhulath
- Kapurthala
- Phagwara
- Sultanpur Lodhi

== Air travel connectivity ==
The closest International airport to the village is Sri Guru Ram Dass Jee International Airport.
