= Nangal Lubana =

- Village
- Location in Punjab, India Nangal Lubana (India)
- Coordinates: 31.6114°N 75.4704°E
- Country: India
- State: Punjab
- District: Kapurthala

Government
  - Type: Panchayati raj (India)
  - Body: Gram panchayat

Area
  - Total: 1.73 km^{2} (0.67 sq mi)

Population (2011)
  - Total: 4,318
  - Density: 2,500/km^{2} (6,460/sq mi)

Languages
  - Official: Punjabi
  - Other spoken: Hindi
- Time zone: UTC+5:30 (IST)
- PIN: 144636
- Telephone code: 01822
- ISO 3166 code: IN-PB
- Vehicle registration: PB-09
- Website: kapurthala.gov.in

Nangal Lubana is a village in Bhulath Tehsil in Kapurthala district of Punjab State, India. It is located 11.5 kilometres (7.1 mi) from Bhulath, 34 kilometres (21 mi) away from district headquarter Kapurthala. The village is administrated by a Sarpanch, who is an elected representative of village as per the constitution of India and Panchayati raj (India).

== Demographics ==
As per 2011 Census of India, Nangal Lubana had 958 number of households and total population was 4,318 persons. There were total of 2,192 males, 2,126 females in 2011 in this village. The total number of children of 6 years or below were 456 in the village. Average Sex Ratio of village was 970 which is higher than Punjab state average of 895.

== List of cities near the village ==
- Bhulath
- Kapurthala
- Phagwara
- Sultanpur Lodhi

== Air travel connectivity ==
The closest International airport to the village is Sri Guru Ram Dass Jee International Airport.
