= Passan Kadim =

- Village
- Location in Punjab, India Passan Kadim (India)
- Coordinates: 31.263067°N 75.123890°E
- Country: India
- State: Punjab
- District: Kapurthala

Government
  - Type: Panchayati raj (India)
  - Body: Gram panchayat

Languages
  - Official: Punjabi
  - Other spoken: Hindi
- Time zone: UTC+5:30 (IST)
- PIN: 144626
- Telephone code: 01822
- ISO 3166 code: IN-PB
- Vehicle registration: PB-09
- Website: kapurthala.gov.in

Passan Kadim is a village in Sultanpur Lodhi tehsil in Kapurthala district of Punjab, India. It is located 19 kilometres (12 mi) from the city of Sultanpur Lodhi, 11 kilometres (6.8 mi) away from district headquarter Kapurthala. The village is administrated by a Sarpanch who is an elected representative of village as per the constitution of India and Panchayati raj (India).

== Demography ==
According to the report published by Census India in 2011, Passan Kadim has a total number of 42 houses and population of 229 of which include 128 males and 101 females. Literacy rate of Passan Kadim is 69.59%, lower than state average of 75.84%. The population of children under the age of 6 years is 35 which is 15.28% of total population of Passan Kadim and child sex ratio is approximately 667, lower than state average of 846.

== Population data ==
Particulars	Total	Male	Female
Total No. of Houses	42	-	-
Population	229	128	101
Child (0-6)	35	21	14
Schedule Caste	8	5	3
Schedule Tribe	0	0	0
Literacy	69.59 %	73.83 %	64.37 %
Total Workers	72	70	2
Main Worker	51	0	0
Marginal Worker	21	19	2

== Work profile ==
As per census 2011, 72 people were engaged in work activities out of the total population of Passan Kadim which includes 70 males and 2 females. According to census survey report 2011, 86.22% workers (Employment or Earning more than 6 Months) describe their work as main work and 13.78% workers are involved in Marginal activity providing livelihood for less than 6 months.

== Caste ==
The village has schedule caste (SC) constitutes 3.49% of total population of the village and it doesn't have any Schedule Tribe (ST) population.

== Air travel connectivity ==
The closest airport to the village is Sri Guru Ram Dass Jee International Airport.

== List of cities near the village ==
- Bhulath
- Kapurthala
- Phagwara
- Sultanpur Lodhi

== Air travel connectivity ==
The closest International airport to the village is Sri Guru Ram Dass Jee International Airport.
