= Bakarpur, Bhulath =

Bakarpur
- Village
- Location in Punjab, India Bakarpur (India)
- Coordinates: 31.147130°N 75.341218°E
- Country: India
- State: Punjab
- District: Kapurthala

Government
  - Type: Panchayati raj (India)
  - Body: Gram panchayat

Population (2011)
  - Total: 462
- Sex ratio 225/237♂/♀

Languages
  - Official: Punjabi
  - Other spoken: Hindi
- Time zone: UTC+5:30 (IST)
- PIN: 144624
- Telephone code: 01822
- ISO 3166 code: IN-PB
- Vehicle registration: PB-09
- Website: kapurthala.gov.in

Bakarpur is a village in Bhulath Tehsil in Kapurthala district of Punjab State, India. It is located 6 kilometres (3.7 mi) from Bhulath, 29 kilometres (18 mi) away from district headquarter Kapurthala. The village is administrated by a Sarpanch, who is an elected representative.

== Demography ==
According to the report published by Census India in 2011, Bakarpur has 108 houses with the total population of 462 persons of which 225 are male and 237 females. Literacy rate of Bakarpur is 80.58%, higher than the state average of 75.84%. The population of children in the age group 0–6 years is 45 which is 9.74% of the total population. Child sex ratio is approximately 607, lower than the state average of 846.

== Population data ==
Particulars	Total	Male	Female
Total No. of Houses	108	-	-
Population	462	225	237
Child (0-6)	45	28	17
Schedule Caste	6	3	3
Schedule Tribe	0	0	0
Literacy	80.58 %	85.79 %	75.91 %
Total Workers	95	90	5
Main Worker	91	0	0
Marginal Worker	4	3	1

As per census 2011, 95 people were engaged in work activities out of the total population of Bakarpur which includes 90 males and 5 females. According to census survey report 2011, 95.79% workers (Employment or Earning more than 6 Months) describe their work as main work and 4.21% workers are involved in Marginal activity providing livelihood for less than 6 months.

== Caste ==
The village has schedule caste (SC) constitutes 1.30% of total population of the village and it doesn't have any Schedule Tribe (ST) population.

== List of cities near the village ==
- Bhulath
- Kapurthala
- Phagwara
- Sultanpur Lodhi

== Air travel connectivity ==
The closest International airport to the village is Sri Guru Ram Dass Jee International Airport.
