= Ballo Chak =

- Village
- Location in Punjab, India Ballo Chak (India)
- Coordinates: 31.638806°N 75.507288°E
- Country: India
- State: Punjab
- District: Kapurthala

Government
  - Type: Panchayati raj (India)
  - Body: Gram panchayat

Population (2011)
  - Total: 1,382
- Sex ratio 741/641♂/♀

Languages
  - Official: Punjabi
  - Other spoken: Hindi
- Time zone: UTC+5:30 (IST)
- PIN: 144636
- Telephone code: 01822
- ISO 3166 code: IN-PB
- Vehicle registration: PB-09
- Website: kapurthala.gov.in

Ballo Chak is a village in Bhulath tehsil in Kapurthala district of Punjab state, India. It is located 30 kilometres (19 mi) from Bhulath and 30 kilometres (19 mi) from the district headquarters at Kapurthala. The village is administrated by a Sarpanch who is an elected representative.

== Population data ==
Particulars	Total	Male	Female
Total No. of Houses	253	-	-
Population	1,382	741	641
Child (0–6)	131	68	63
Schedule Caste	611	317	294
Schedule Tribe	0	0	0
Literacy	71.22 %	76.67 %	64.88 %
Total Workers	471	433	38
Main Worker	308	0	0
Marginal Worker	163	146	17

== Nearby cities ==
- Bhulath
- Kapurthala
- Phagwara
- Sultanpur Lodhi

== Air travel connectivity ==
The closest International airport to the village is Sri Guru Ram Dass Jee International Airport.
