= Bagwanpur =

- Village
- Location in Punjab, India Bagwanpur (India)
- Coordinates: 31.535369°N 75.509868°E
- Country: India
- State: Punjab
- District: Kapurthala

Government
  - Type: Panchayati raj (India)
  - Body: Gram panchayat

Population (2011)
  - Total: 1,027
- Sex ratio 566/461♂/♀

Languages
  - Official: Punjabi
  - Other spoken: Hindi
- Time zone: UTC+5:30 (IST)
- PIN: 144619
- Telephone code: 01822
- ISO 3166 code: IN-PB
- Vehicle registration: PB-09
- Website: kapurthala.gov.in

Bagwanpur is a village in Bhulath Tehsil in the Kapurthala district of Punjab State, India. It is located 4 kilometres (2.5 mi) from Bhulath, and 28 kilometres (17 mi) away from the district headquarters Kapurthala. The village is administrated by a sarpanch who is an elected representative of the village.

== Demography ==
According to the report published by Census India in 2011, Bagwanpur has 208 houses with the total population of 1,027 persons, of which 566 are males and 461 females. Literacy rate of Bagwanpur is 81.19%, higher than the state average of 75.84%. The population of children in the age group 0–6 years is 102, which is 9.93% of the total population. The child sex ratio is approximately 672, lower than the state average of 846.

As per the 2011 census, 295 people were engaged in work activities out of the total population of Bagwanpur, which includes 283 males and 12 females. According to the census survey report, 85.08% of workers (Employment or Earning more than 6 Months) describe their work as their main work, and 14.92% of workers are involved in marginal activity, providing a livelihood for less than 6 months.

The village has a scheduled caste (SC) constitutes 12.85% of total population of the village, and it doesn't have any Scheduled Tribe (ST) population.

== List of cities near the village ==
- Bhulath
- Kapurthala
- Phagwara
- Sultanpur Lodhi

== Air travel connectivity ==
The closest International airport to the village is Sri Guru Ram Dass Jee International Airport.
