= Mokha, Sultanpur Lodhi =

Mokha
- Village
- Location in Punjab, India Mokha (India)
- Coordinates: 31.208119°N 75.245718°E
- Country: India
- State: Punjab
- District: Kapurthala

Government
  - Type: Panchayati raj (India)
  - Body: Gram panchayat

Languages
  - Official: Punjabi
  - Other spoken: Hindi
- Time zone: UTC+5:30 (IST)
- PIN: 144626
- Telephone code: 01822
- ISO 3166 code: IN-PB
- Vehicle registration: PB-09
- Website: kapurthala.gov.in

Mokha is a village in Sultanpur Lodhi tehsil in Kapurthala district of Punjab, India. It is located 25 kilometres (16 mi) from the city of kapurthala, 5 kilometres (3.1 mi) away from Sultanpur Lodhi. The village is administrated by a Sarpanch who is an elected representative of village as per the constitution of India and Panchayati raj (India).

The closest International airport to the village is Sri Guru Ram Dass Jee International Airport.

== List of cities near the village ==
- Bhulath
- Kapurthala
- Phagwara
- Sultanpur Lodhi
