= Mand Dhakran =

- Village
- Location in Punjab, India Mand Dhakran (India)
- Coordinates: 31.6084°N 75.4480°E
- Country: India
- State: Punjab
- District: Kapurthala
- Tehsil: Bhulath
- Region: Majha

Government
  - Type: Panchayat raj
  - Body: Gram panchayat

Area
  - Total: 57.2 ha (141 acres)

Population (2011)
  - Total: 7; 2/5 ♂/♀
  - Scheduled Castes: 7; 2/5 ♂/♀
  - Total Households: 1

Languages
  - Official: Punjabi
- Time zone: UTC+5:30 (IST)
- ISO 3166 code: IN-PB
- Website: kapurthala.gov.in

Mand Dhakran is a village in Bhulath in Kapurthala district of Punjab State, India. It is located 10 kilometres (6.2 mi) from sub district headquarter and 27 kilometres (17 mi) from district headquarter. The village is administrated by Sarpanch an elected representative of the village.

== Demography ==
As of 2011, The village has a total number of 1 houses and the population of 7 of which 2 are males while 5 are females. According to the report published by Census India in 2011, out of the total population of the village 7 people are from Schedule Caste and the village does not have any Schedule Tribe population so far.

== See also ==
- List of villages in India
