= Mira, Sultanpur Lodhi =

Mira
- Village
- Location in Punjab, India Mira (India)
- Coordinates: 31.257115°N 75.204147°E
- Country: India
- State: Punjab
- District: Kapurthala

Government
  - Type: Panchayati raj (India)
  - Body: Gram panchayat

Languages
  - Official: Punjabi
  - Other spoken: Hindi
- Time zone: UTC+5:30 (IST)
- PIN: 144620
- Telephone code: 01822
- ISO 3166 code: IN-PB
- Vehicle registration: PB-09
- Website: kapurthala.gov.in

Mira is a village in Sultanpur Lodhi tehsil in Kapurthala district of Punjab, India. It is located 4 kilometres (2.5 mi) from the city of Sultanpur Lodhi, 25 kilometres (16 mi) away from district headquarter Kapurthala. The village is administrated by a Sarpanch who is an elected representative of village as per the constitution of India and Panchayati raj (India).

== Demography ==
According to the report published by Census India in 2011, Mira has 60 houses with the total population of 287 persons of which 141 are male and 146 females. Literacy rate of Mira is 66.67%, lower than the state average of 75.84%. The population of children in the age group 0–6 years is 38 which is 13.24% of the total population. Child sex ratio is approximately 1923, higher than the state average of 846.

== Population data ==
Particulars	Total	Male	Female
Total No. of Houses	60	-	-
Population	287	141	146
Child (0-6)	38	13	25
Schedule Caste	133	65	68
Schedule Tribe	0	0	0
Literacy	66.67 %	70.31 %	62.81 %
Total Workers	99	81	18
Main Worker	94	0	0
Marginal Worker	5	3	2

== Work Profile ==
In Mira village out of total population, 99 were engaged in work activities. 94.95% of workers describe their work as Main Work (Employment or Earning more than 6 Months) while 5.05% were involved in Marginal activity providing livelihood for less than 6 months. Of 99 workers engaged in Main Work, 16 were cultivators (owner or co-owner) while 42 were Agricultural labourer.

== Caste ==
In Mira village, most of the villagers are from Schedule Caste (SC). Schedule Caste (SC) constitutes 46.34% of total population in Mira village. The village Mira currently doesn’t have any Schedule Tribe (ST) population.

== List of cities near the village ==
- Bhulath
- Kapurthala
- Phagwara
- Sultanpur Lodhi

== Air travel connectivity ==
The closest International airport to the village is Sri Guru Ram Dass Jee International Airport.
