= Sarai Jattan =

- Village
- Location in Punjab, India Sarai Jattan (India)
- Coordinates: 31.258526°N 75.190427°E
- Country: India
- State: Punjab
- District: Kapurthala

Government
  - Type: Panchayati raj (India)
  - Body: Gram panchayat

Languages
  - Official: Punjabi
  - Other spoken: Hindi
- Time zone: UTC+5:30 (IST)
- PIN: 144626
- Telephone code: 01828
- ISO 3166 code: IN-PB
- Vehicle registration: PB-41
- Website: kapurthala.gov.in

Sarai Jattan is a village in Sultanpur Lodhi tehsil in Kapurthala district of Punjab, India. It is located 6 kilometres (3.7 mi) from the city of Sultanpur Lodhi, 30 kilometres (19 mi) away from district headquarter Kapurthala. The village is administrated by a Sarpanch, who is an elected representative.

== Demography ==
According to the report published by Census India in 2011, Sarai Jattan has 136 houses with the total population of 678 persons of which 336 are male and 342 females. Literacy rate of Sarai Jattan is 68.14%, lower than the state average of 75.84%. The population of children in the age group 0–6 years is 91 which is 13.42% of the total population. Child sex ratio is approximately 1022, higher than the state average of 846.

== Population data ==
Particulars	Total	Male	Female
Total No. of Houses	136	-	-
Population	678	336	342
Child (0–6)	91	45	46
Schedule Caste	286	148	138
Schedule Tribe	0	0	0
Literacy	68.14 %	74.23 %	62.16 %
Total Workers	219	176	43
Main Worker	161	0	0
Marginal Worker	58	33	25

== Work Profile ==
In Sarai Jattan village out of total population, 219 were engaged in work activities. 73.52% of workers describe their work as Main Work (Employment or Earning more than 6 Months) while 26.48% were involved in Marginal activity providing livelihood for less than 6 months. Of 219 workers engaged in Main Work, 71 were cultivators (owner or co-owner) while 50 were Agricultural labourer.

== Caste ==
In Sarai Jattan village, most of the villagers are from Schedule Caste (SC). Schedule Caste (SC) constitutes 42.18% of total population in Sarai Jattan village. The village Sarai Jattan currently doesn't have any Schedule Tribe (ST) population.

== List of cities near the village ==
- Bhulath
- Kapurthala
- Phagwara
- Sultanpur Lodhi

== Air travel connectivity ==
The closest International airport to the village is Sri Guru Ram Dass Jee International Airport.
