= Lakh Waryah =

- Village
- Location in Punjab, India Lakh Waryah (India)
- Coordinates: 31.269808°N 75.228945°E
- Country: India
- State: Punjab
- District: Kapurthala

Government
  - Type: Panchayati raj (India)
  - Body: Gram panchayat

Languages
  - Official: Punjabi
  - Other spoken: Hindi
- Time zone: UTC+5:30 (IST)
- PIN: 144626
- Telephone code: 01822
- ISO 3166 code: IN-PB
- Vehicle registration: PB-09
- Website: kapurthala.gov.in

Lakh Waryah is a village in Sultanpur Lodhi tehsil in Kapurthala district of Punjab, India. It is located 15 kilometres (9.3 mi) from the city of Sultanpur Lodhi, 40 kilometres (25 mi) away from district headquarter Kapurthala. The village is administrated by a Sarpanch who is an elected representative of village as per the constitution of India and Panchayati raj (India).

== Demography ==
According to the report published by Census India in 2011, Lakh Waryah has a total number of 112 houses and population of 651 of which include 343 males and 308 females. Literacy rate of Lakh Waryah is 63.44%, lower than state average of 75.84%. The population of children under the age of 6 years is 63 which is 9.68% of total population of Lakh Waryah and child sex ratio is approximately 1032, higher than state average of 846.

== Population data ==
Particulars	Total	Male	Female
Total No. of Houses	112	-	-
Population	651	343	308
Child (0-6)	63	31	32
Schedule Caste	488	255	233
Schedule Tribe	0	0	0
Literacy	63.44 %	69.23 %	56.88 %
Total Workers	196	192	4
Main Worker	169	0	0
Marginal Worker	27	25	2

== Work profile ==
As per census 2011, 196 people were engaged in work activities out of the total population of Lakh Waryah which includes 192 males and 4 females. According to census survey report 2011, 86.22% workers (Employment or Earning more than 6 Months) describe their work as main work and 13.78% workers are involved in Marginal activity providing livelihood for less than 6 months.

== Caste ==
The village has schedule caste (SC) constitutes 74.96% of total population of the village and it doesn't have any Schedule Tribe (ST) population.

== Air travel connectivity ==
The closest airport to the village is Sri Guru Ram Dass Jee International Airport.

== List of cities near the village ==
- Bhulath
- Kapurthala
- Phagwara
- Sultanpur Lodhi

== Air travel connectivity ==
The closest International airport to the village is Sri Guru Ram Dass Jee International Airport.
