= Chak Shah Kala =

- Village
- Location in Punjab, India Chak Shah Kala (India)
- Coordinates: 31.551243°N 75.462147°E
- Country: India
- State: Punjab
- District: Kapurthala

Government
  - Type: Panchayati raj (India)
  - Body: Gram panchayat

Languages
  - Official: Punjabi
  - Other spoken: Hindi
- Time zone: UTC+5:30 (IST)
- PIN: 144619
- Telephone code: 01822
- ISO 3166 code: IN-PB
- Vehicle registration: PB-09
- Website: kapurthala.gov.in

Chak Shah Kala is a village near Bholath Tehsil in Kapurthala district of Punjab State, India. Kapurthala and Bholath are the district & sub-district headquarters of Chak Shah Kala village respectively.

== List of cities near the village ==
- Bhulath
- Kapurthala
- Phagwara
- Sultanpur Lodhi

== Air travel connectivity ==
The closest International airport to the village is Sri Guru Ram Dass Jee International Airport.
