= Talwandi Chaudhrian =

- Village
- Location in Punjab, India Talwandi Chaudhrian (India)
- Coordinates: 31.300004°N 75.176426°E
- Country: India
- State: Punjab
- District: Kapurthala

Government
  - Type: Panchayati raj (India)
  - Body: Gram panchayat

Languages
  - Official: Punjabi
  - Other spoken: Hindi
- Time zone: UTC+5:30 (IST)
- PIN: 144606
- Telephone code: 01822
- ISO 3166 code: IN-PB
- Vehicle registration: PB-09
- Website: kapurthala.gov.in

Talwandi Chaudhrian is a village in Sultanpur Lodhi tehsil in Kapurthala district of Punjab, India. It is located 10 kilometres (6.2 mi) from the city of Sultanpur Lodhi and 25 kilometres (16 mi) away from the district headquarters Kapurthala. The village is administered by a Sarpanch who is an elected representative of village as per the constitution of India and Panchayati raj (India).

== List of cities near the village ==
- Bhulath
- Kapurthala
- Phagwara
- Sultanpur Lodhi

== Air travel connectivity ==
The closest International airport to the village is Sri Guru Ram Dass Jee International Airport.
