= Gudda =

- Village
- Location in Punjab, India Gudda (India)
- Coordinates: 31.228132°N 74.918022°E
- Country: India
- State: Punjab
- District: Kapurthala

Government
  - Type: Panchayati raj (India)
  - Body: Gram panchayat

Languages
  - Official: Punjabi
  - Other spoken: Hindi
- Time zone: UTC+5:30 (IST)
- PIN: 144628
- Telephone code: 01822
- ISO 3166 code: IN-PB
- Vehicle registration: PB-09
- Website: kapurthala.gov.in

Gudda is a village in Sultanpur Lodhi tehsil in Kapurthala district of Punjab, India. The cities of Kapurthala and Sultanpur Lodhi are the district & sub-district headquarters, respectively, of the district in which Gudda village is located. The village is administrated by a Sarpanch who is an elected representative of village, as per the constitution of India and Panchayati raj (India).

== Air travel connectivity ==
The village's nearest international airport is Sri Guru Ram Dass Jee International Airport, located near Amritsar.

== List of cities near the village ==
- Bhulath
- Kapurthala
- Phagwara
- Sultanpur Lodhi
