= Talwandi Koka =

Talwandi Kuka
- Village
- Talwandi Kuka
- Location in Punjab, India Talwandi Kuka (India)
- Coordinates: 31.371480°N 75.393681°E
- Country: India
- State: Punjab
- District: Kapurthala

Government
  - Type: Panchayati raj (India)
  - Body: Gram panchayat

Population (2011)
  - Total: 758
- Sex ratio 352/406♂/♀

Languages
  - Official: Punjabi
  - Other spoken: Hindi
- Time zone: UTC+5:30 (IST)
- PIN: 144619
- Telephone code: 01822
- ISO 3166 code: IN-PB
- Vehicle registration: PB-09
- Website: kapurthala.gov.in

Talwandi Kuka is a village in Bholath Tehsil in Kapurthala district of Punjab State, India. It is located 7 kilometres (4.3 mi) from Bholath, 27 kilometres (17 mi) away from district headquarter Kapurthala. The village is administrated by a Sarpanch, who is an elected representative.

== Demography ==
According to the report published by Census India in 2011, Talwandi Kuka has 177 houses with the total population of 758 persons of which 352 are male and 406 females. Literacy rate of Talwandi Kuka is 74.78%, lower than the state average of 75.84%. The population of children in the age group 0–6 years is 88 which is 11.61% of the total population. Child sex ratio is approximately 913, higher than the state average of 846.

== Population data ==
Particulars	Total	Male	Female
Total No. of Houses	177	-	-
Population	758	352	406
Child (0-6)	88	46	42
Schedule Caste	89	41	48
Schedule Tribe	0	0	0
Literacy	74.78 %	80.07 %	70.33 %
Total Workers	151	137	14
Main Worker	137	0	0
Marginal Worker	14	10	4

As per census 2011, 151 people were engaged in work activities out of the total population of Talwandi Kuka which includes 137 males and 14 females. According to census survey report 2011, 90.73% workers (Employment or Earning more than 6 Months) describe their work as main work and 9.27% workers are involved in Marginal activity providing livelihood for less than 6 months.

== Caste ==
The village has schedule caste (SC) constitutes 11.74% of total population of the village and it doesn't have any Schedule Tribe (ST) population.

== List of cities near the village ==
- Bhulath
- Kapurthala
- Phagwara
- Sultanpur Lodhi

== Air travel connectivity ==
The closest International airport to the village is Sri Guru Ram Dass Jee International Airport.
