= Bhakuwal =

- Village
- Location in Punjab, India Bhakuwal (India)
- Coordinates: 31.582685°N 75.408251°E
- Country: India
- State: Punjab
- District: Kapurthala

Government
  - Type: Panchayati raj (India)
  - Body: Gram panchayat

Population (2011)
  - Total: 368
- Sex ratio 191/177♂/♀

Languages
  - Official: Punjabi
  - Other spoken: Hindi
- Time zone: UTC+5:30 (IST)
- PIN: 144624
- Telephone code: 01822
- ISO 3166 code: IN-PB
- Vehicle registration: PB-09
- Website: kapurthala.gov.in

Bhakuwal is a village in Bhulath tehsil in Kapurthala district, Punjab state, India. It is located 27 kilometres (17 mi) from Bhulath and the same distance from the district headquarters at Kapurthala. The village is administrated by a Sarpanch.

== Nearby cities ==
- Bhulath
- Kapurthala
- Phagwara
- Sultanpur Lodhi

== Air travel connectivity ==
The closest International airport to the village is Sri Guru Ram Dass Jee International Airport.
