= Mand Gurdaspur =

- Village
- Location in Punjab, India Mand Gurdaspur (India)
- Coordinates: 31.626362°N 75.435929°E
- Country: India
- State: Punjab
- District: Kapurthala

Government
  - Type: Panchayati raj (India)
  - Body: Gram panchayat

Languages
  - Official: Punjabi
  - Other spoken: Hindi
- Time zone: UTC+5:30 (IST)
- PIN: 144619
- Telephone code: 01822
- ISO 3166 code: IN-PB
- Vehicle registration: PB-09
- Website: kapurthala.gov.in

Mand Gurdaspur is a village in Bhulath Tehsil in Kapurthala district of Punjab State, India. It is located 15 kilometres (9.3 mi) from Bhulath, 33 kilometres (21 mi) away from district headquarter Kapurthala. The village is administered by a Sarpanch who is an elected representative of the village as per the constitution of India and Panchayati raj (India).

== List of cities near the village ==
- Bhulath
- Kapurthala
- Phagwara
- Sultanpur Lodhi

== Air travel connectivity ==
The closest International airport to the village is Sri Guru Ram Dass Jee International Airport.
