= Chogawan, Bhulath =

Chogawan
- Village
- Location in Punjab, India Chogawan (India)
- Coordinates: 31.371480°N 75.393681°E
- Country: India
- State: Punjab
- District: Kapurthala

Government
  - Type: Panchayati raj (India)
  - Body: Gram panchayat

Languages
  - Official: Punjabi
  - Other spoken: Hindi
- Time zone: UTC+5:30 (IST)
- PIN: 144624
- Telephone code: 01822
- ISO 3166 code: IN-PB
- Vehicle registration: PB-09
- Website: kapurthala.gov.in

Chogawan is a village in Bhulath tehsil in the Kapurthala district of Punjab State, India. It is located 27 kilometres (17 mi) from Bhulath and 121 kilometres (75 mi) from the district headquarters, Kapurthala. The village is administered by a sarpanch who is an elected representative of the village in accordance with the constitution of India and the Panchayati raj.

== List of cities near the village ==
- Bhulath
- Kapurthala
- Phagwara
- Sultanpur Lodhi

== Air travel connectivity ==
The closest international airport to the village is Sri Guru Ram Dass Jee International Airport.
