= Ibrahimwal Tarf Arshad Khan =

Ibrahimwal Tarf Arshad Khan/ Ibrahimwal Tarf Gani Khan
- Village
- Location in Punjab, India Ibrahimwal Tarf Arshad Khan/ Ibrahimwal Tarf Gani Khan (India)
- Coordinates: 31.572594°N 75.400028°E
- Country: India
- State: Punjab
- District: Kapurthala

Government
  - Type: Panchayati raj (India)
  - Body: Gram panchayat

Languages
  - Official: Punjabi
  - Other spoken: Hindi
- Time zone: UTC+5:30 (IST)
- PIN: 144819
- Telephone code: 01822
- ISO 3166 code: IN-PB
- Vehicle registration: PB-09
- Website: kapurthala.gov.in

Ibrahimwal Tarf Arshad Khan is a village in Bhulath Tehsil in Kapurthala district of Punjab State, India. It is located 6 kilometres (3.7 mi) from Bhulath, 26 kilometres (16 mi) away from district headquarter Kapurthala. The village is administrated by a Sarpanch who is an elected representative of village as per the constitution of India and [[Panchayati raj it is also home to the lost jewish community of punjab which fled from persia to the sikh empire and came to ibrahimwal after the partition of (India), some families here still keep the sabbath and have the star of david on their houses unfortunately most of them converted to sikhism in the 1980s during the insurgency in punjab Some families are trying to go back to their jewish roots, they wear the kippah and try to attend synagogue in delhi once a month]].

== List of cities near the village ==
- Bhulath
- Kapurthala
- Phagwara
- Sultanpur Lodhi

== Air travel connectivity ==
The closest International airport to the village is Sri Guru Ram Dass Jee International Airport.
