= Dewa Singhwala =

- Village
- Location in Punjab, India Dewa Singhwala (India)
- Coordinates: 31.138095°N 74.989550°E
- Country: India
- State: Punjab
- District: Kapurthala

Government
  - Type: Panchayati raj (India)
  - Body: Gram panchayat

Languages
  - Official: Punjabi
  - Other spoken: Hindi
- Time zone: UTC+5:30 (IST)
- PIN: 144628
- Telephone code: 01822
- ISO 3166 code: IN-PB
- Vehicle registration: PB-09
- Website: kapurthala.gov.in

Dewa Singhwala is a village in Sultanpur Lodhi tehsil in Kapurthala district of Punjab, India. Dewa Singhwala village is located in Sultanpur Lodhi Tehsil of Kapurthala district in Punjab, India. Kapurthala and Sultanpur Lodhi are the district & sub-district headquarters of Dewa Singhwala village respectively. The village is administrated by a Sarpanch who is an elected representative of village as per the constitution of India and Panchayati raj (India).

== List of cities near the village ==
- Bhulath
- Kapurthala
- Phagwara
- Sultanpur Lodhi

== Air travel connectivity ==
The closest International airport to the village is Sri Guru Ram Dass Jee International Airport.
