= Mand Nangal Lubana =

- Village
- Location in Punjab, India Mand Nangal Lubana (India)
- Coordinates: 31.6175°N 75.4463°E
- Country: India
- State: Punjab
- District: Kapurthala
- Tehsil: Bhulath
- Region: Majha

Government
  - Type: Panchayat raj
  - Body: Gram panchayat

Area
  - Total: 124 ha (310 acres)

Population (2011)
  - Total: 21; 13/8 ♂/♀
  - Scheduled Castes: 0; 0/0 ♂/♀
  - Total Households: 6

Languages
  - Official: Punjabi
- Time zone: UTC+5:30 (IST)
- ISO 3166 code: IN-PB
- Website: kapurthala.gov.in

Mand Nangal Lubana is a village in Bhulath in Kapurthala District of Punjab State, India. It is 13 kilometres (8.1 mi) from sub district headquarters and 25 kilometres (16 mi) from district headquarters. The village is administered by Sarpanch, an elected representative of the village.

== Demography ==
As of 2011, the village had a total of six houses and a population of 21 of which 13 are males and eight are females. According to the report published by Census India in 2011, of the total population of the village zero people are from schedule castes or schedule tribes.

== See also ==
- List of villages in India
