= Alahdad Chak =

- Village
- Location in Punjab, India Alahdad Chak (India)
- Coordinates: 31.224104°N 75.196194°E
- Country: India
- State: Punjab
- District: Kapurthala

Government
  - Type: Panchayati raj (India)
  - Body: Gram panchayat

Languages
  - Official: Punjabi
  - Other spoken: Hindi
- Time zone: UTC+5:30 (IST)
- PIN: 144626
- Telephone code: 01822
- ISO 3166 code: IN-PB
- Vehicle registration: PB-09
- Website: kapurthala.gov.in

Alahdad Chak is a village in Sultanpur Lodhi tehsil in Kapurthala district of Punjab, India. It is located 2 kilometres (1.2 mi) from the city of Sultanpur Lodhi, 34 kilometres (21 mi) away from district headquarter Kapurthala. The village is administrated by a Sarpanch who is an elected representative of village as per the constitution of India and Panchayati raj (India).

== List of cities near the village ==
- Bhulath
- Kapurthala
- Phagwara
- Sultanpur Lodhi

== Air travel connectivity ==
The closest International airport to the village is Sri Guru Ram Dass Jee International Airport.
