= Mand Ibrahimwal Tarf Gulam Nabi Khan =

- Village
- Location in Punjab, India Mand Ibrahimwal; Tarf Gulam Nabi Khan (India)
- Coordinates: 31.6175°N 75.4463°E
- Country: India
- State: Punjab
- District: Kapurthala
- Tehsil: Bhulath
- Region: Majha

Government
  - Type: Panchayat raj
  - Body: Gram panchayat

Area
  - Total: 57 ha (140 acres)

Population (2011)
  - Total: 10; 7/3 ♂/♀
  - Scheduled Castes: 10; 7/3 ♂/♀
  - Total Households: 1

Languages
  - Official: Punjabi
- Time zone: UTC+5:30 (IST)
- ISO 3166 code: IN-PB
- Website: kapurthala.gov.in

Mand Ibrahimwal Tarf Gulam Nabi Khan is a village in Bhulath in Kapurthala district of Punjab State, India. It is located 7 kilometres (4.3 mi) from sub district headquarter and 26 kilometres (16 mi) from district headquarter. The village is administrated by Sarpanch an elected representative of the village.

== Demography ==
As of 2011, The village has a total number of 1 houses and the population of 10 of which 7 are males while 3 are females. According to the report published by Census India in 2011, out of the total population of the village 10 people are from Schedule Caste and the village does not have any Schedule Tribe population so far.

== See also ==
- List of villages in India
