= Bhadas =

- Village
- Location in Punjab, India Bhadas (India)
- Coordinates: 31.584991°N 75.506560°E
- Country: India
- State: Punjab
- District: Kapurthala

Government
  - Type: Panchayati raj (India)
  - Body: Gram panchayat

Population (2011)
  - Total: 2,222
- Sex ratio 1079/1143♂/♀

Languages
  - Official: Punjabi
  - Other spoken: Hindi
- Time zone: UTC+5:30 (IST)
- PIN: 144619
- Telephone code: 01822
- ISO 3166 code: IN-PB
- Vehicle registration: PB-09
- Website: kapurthala.gov.in

Bhadas is a village in Bhulath tehsil in Kapurthala district of Punjab State, India. It is located 5 kilometres (3.1 mi) from Bhulath, 29 kilometres (18 mi) away from district headquarter Kapurthala. The village is administrated by a Sarpanch who is an elected representative of village as per the constitution of India and Panchayati raj (India).

== List of cities near the village ==
- Bhulath
- Kapurthala
- Phagwara
- Sultanpur Lodhi

== Air travel connectivity ==
The closest international airport to the village is Sri Guru Ram Dass Jee International Airport.
