= Wadhel Khuda Bakhashwala =

- Village
- Location in Punjab, India Wadhel Khuda Bakhashwala (India)
- Coordinates: 31.258482°N 75.215817°E
- Country: India
- State: Punjab
- District: Kapurthala

Government
  - Type: Panchayati raj (India)
  - Body: Gram panchayat

Languages
  - Official: Punjabi
  - Other spoken: Hindi
- Time zone: UTC+5:30 (IST)
- PIN: 144620
- Telephone code: 01822
- ISO 3166 code: IN-PB
- Vehicle registration: PB-09
- Website: kapurthala.gov.in

Wadhel Khuda Bakhashwala is a village in Sultanpur Lodhi tehsil in Kapurthala district of Punjab, India. It is located 10 kilometres (6.2 mi) from the city of Sultanpur Lodhi, 20 kilometres (12 mi) away from district headquarter Kapurthala. The village is administrated by a Sarpanch who is an elected representative of village as per the constitution of India and Panchayati raj (India).

== Demography ==
According to the report published by Census India in 2011, Mira has 6 houses with the total population of 27 persons of which 17 are male and 10 females. Literacy rate of Mira is 70.37%, lower than the state average of 75.84%. The population of children in the age group 0–6 years is zero which is 0.00% of the total population. Child sex ratio is approximately 0, lower than the state average of 846.

== Population data ==
Particulars	Total	Male	Female
Total No. of Houses	6	-	-
Population	27	17	10
Child (0-6)	0	0	0
Schedule Caste	0	0	0
Schedule Tribe	0	0	0
Literacy	70.37 %	76.47 %	60.00 %
Total Workers	7	7	0
Main Worker	6	0	0
Marginal Worker	1	1	0

== Work Profile ==
In Wadhel Khuda Bakhashwala village out of total population, 7 were engaged in work activities. 85.71% of workers describe their work as Main Work (Employment or Earning more than 6 Months) while 14.29% were involved in Marginal activity providing livelihood for less than 6 months.

== Caste ==
The village Wadhel Khuda Bakhashwala currently doesn’t have any Schedule Caste (SC) and Schedule Tribe (ST) population.

== List of cities near the village ==
- Bhulath
- Kapurthala
- Phagwara
- Sultanpur Lodhi

== Air travel connectivity ==
The closest International airport to the village is Sri Guru Ram Dass Jee International Airport.
