= Mandi Road =

- Village
- Country: India
- State: Punjab
- District: Kapurthala
- Tehsil: Bhulath
- Region: Majha

Government
  - Type: Panchayat raj
  - Body: Gram panchayat

Area
  - Total: 163 ha (400 acres)

Population (2011)
  - Total: 353; 170/183 ♂/♀
  - Scheduled Castes: 37; 17/20 ♂/♀
  - Total Households: 73

Languages
  - Official: Punjabi
- Time zone: UTC+5:30 (IST)
- ISO 3166 code: IN-PB
- Website: kapurthala.gov.in

Mandi Road is a village in Bhulath in Kapurthala district of Punjab State, India. It is located 31 kilometres (19 mi) from sub district headquarter and 31 kilometres (19 mi) from district headquarter. The village is administrated by Sarpanch an elected representative of the village.

== Demography ==
As of 2011, The village has a total of 73 houses and a population of 353, including 170 males and 183 females. According to the report published by Census India in 2011, out of the total population of the village, 37 people are from Schedule Caste and the village does not have a Schedule Tribe population.

== See also ==
- List of villages in India
