= Billpur =

- Village
- Location in Punjab, India Billpur (India)
- Coordinates: 31.549636°N 75.439207°E
- Country: India
- State: Punjab
- District: Kapurthala

Government
  - Type: Panchayati raj (India)
  - Body: Gram panchayat

Population (2011)
  - Total: 507
- Sex ratio 260/247♂/♀

Languages
  - Official: Punjabi
  - Other spoken: Hindi
- Time zone: UTC+5:30 (IST)
- PIN: 144624
- Telephone code: 01822
- ISO 3166 code: IN-PB
- Vehicle registration: PB-09
- Website: kapurthala.gov.in

Billpur is a village in Bhulath tehsil in Kapurthala district of Punjab State, India. It is located 25 kilometres (16 mi) from Bhulath and 25 kilometres (16 mi) from the district headquarters at Kapurthala. The village is administrated by a Sarpanch who is an elected representative of village.

== List of cities near the village ==
- Bhulath
- Kapurthala
- Phagwara
- Sultanpur Lodhi

== Airport ==
The closest International airport to the village is Sri Guru Ram Dass Jee International Airport.
