= Ibrahimwal Taraf Gulam Nabi Khan =

- Village
- Location in Punjab, India Ibrahimwal Taraf Gulam Nabi Khan (India)
- Coordinates: 31.5741°N 75.4351°E
- Country: India
- State: Punjab
- District: Kapurthala
- Tehsil: Bhulath
- Region: Majha

Government
  - Type: Panchayat raj
  - Body: Gram panchayat

Area
  - Total: 270 ha (670 acres)

Population (2011)
  - Total: 16; 10/6 ♂/♀
  - Total Households: 4

Languages
  - Official: Punjabi
- Time zone: UTC+5:30 (IST)
- ISO 3166 code: IN-PB
- Website: kapurthala.gov.in

Ibrahimwal Taraf Gulam Nabi Khan is a village in Bhulath in Kapurthala district of Punjab State, India. It is located 6 kilometres (3.7 mi) from sub district headquarter and 26 kilometres (16 mi) from district headquarter. The village is administrated by Sarpanch an elected representative of the village.

== Demography ==
As of 2011, The village has a total number of 4 houses and the population of 16 of which 10 are males while 6 are females. According to the report published by Census India in 2011, the village does not have any Schedule Caste or Schedule Tribe population so far.

== See also ==
- List of villages in India
