= Bholath =

- Town
- Location in Punjab, India Bholath (India)
- Coordinates: 31.5328°N 75.5022°E
- Country: India
- State: Punjab
- District: Kapurthala

Government
  - Type: NAGAR PANCHAYAT

Population (2001)
  - Total: 10,079

Languages
  - Official: Punjabi
- Time zone: UTC+5:30 (IST)
- Telephone code: 91-1822
- Vehicle registration: PB-57

Bholath is a town and a nagar panchayat in Kapurthala district in the state of Punjab, India. Bholath was town of raja Bharat. Khassan is a village near to Bholath which is approximately 2.4 km.

== Demographics ==
As of 2001 India census, Bholath had a population of 10,548. Males constitute 53% of the population and females 47%. Bholath has a literacy rate of 70%, higher than the national average of 59.5%; with male literacy at 75% and female literacy at 65%. 11% of the population is under 6 years of age. Bholath is a Sub Division of Kapurthala District and has a police station, Sub-Division Tehsil Complex and Sub-Division Court Complex. Bholath has very old Krishan Temple to visit

Bholath is a fast development town. It is mainly recognized as NRI Area. Many of persons from this surrounding area go abroad for good earning. There are some good schools in Bholath as Christ the King Convent School, Satkartar International High School, Shishu Model senior secondary School (Sh. Krishan Lal Sharma Ji), Young Petals Public School.

From- Bholath People.
