= Rampur Sunran =

- Village
- Location in Punjab, India Rampur Sunran (India)
- Coordinates: 31.314316°N 75.781479°E
- Country: India
- State: Punjab
- District: Kapurthala

Government
  - Type: Panchayati raj (India)
  - Body: Gram panchayat

Population (2011)
  - Total: 1,557
- Sex ratio 795/762♂/♀

Languages
  - Official: Punjabi
  - Other spoken: Hindi
- Time zone: UTC+5:30 (IST)
- PIN: 144407
- Telephone code: 01822
- ISO 3166 code: IN-PB
- Vehicle registration: PB-09
- Website: kapurthala.gov.in

Rampur Sunran is a village in Phagwara Tehsil in Kapurthala district of Punjab State, India. It is located 52 kilometres (32 mi) from Kapurthala, 12 kilometres (7.5 mi) from Phagwara. The village is administrated by a Sarpanch who is an elected representative of village as per the constitution of India and Panchayati raj.

== Transport ==
Phagwara Junction Railway Station, Mauli Halt Railway Station are the nearby railway stations to Rampur. Jalandhar City Rail Way Station is 23 km away from the village. The village is 118 km away from Sri Guru Ram Dass Jee International Airport in Amritsar. Another nearby airport is Sahnewal Airport in Ludhiana which is located 40 km away from the village. Phagwara, Jandiala, Jalandhar, Phillaur are the nearby cities to Rampur Sunran village.

== Nearby villages ==
- Babeli
- Bhabiana
- Bir Dhadoli
- Dhadoli
- Dhak Dhandoli
- Domeli
- Dug
- Lakhpur
- Sahni
- Lakhpur
- Pandori
- Sangatpur
- Sikri
