= Bhabiana =

- Village
- Location in Punjab, India Bhabiana (India)
- Coordinates: 31.329334°N 75.796737°E
- Country: India
- State: Punjab
- District: Kapurthala

Government
  - Type: Panchayati raj (India)
  - Body: Gram panchayat

Population (2011)
  - Total: 1,813
- Sex ratio 957/856♂/♀

Languages
  - Official: Punjabi
  - Other spoken: Hindi
- Time zone: UTC+5:30 (IST)
- PIN: 144408
- Telephone code: 01822
- ISO 3166 code: IN-PB
- Vehicle registration: PB-09
- Website: kapurthala.gov.in

Bhabiana is a village in the Phagwara Tehsil in Kapurthala district of Punjab State, India. It is located 52 kilometres (32 mi) from Kapurthala and 12 kilometres (7.5 mi) from Phagwara. The village is administrated by a Sarpanch who is an elected representative of the village, as per the Constitution of India and the Panchayati raj.

== Transport ==
There is no railway station that is near Bhabiana village for less than 10 km. However, Jalandhar City Railway Station is a major railway station and transport hub that is 21 km from the village. Additionally, Bhabiana is 114 km away from the Sri Guru Ram Dass Jee International Airport in Amritsar. Another nearby airport is the Sahnewal Airport in Ludhiana which is located 53 km away from the village. Phagwara, Jandiala, Jalandhar, Hoshiarpur are also the closest cities to Bhabiana village.

== Nearby villages ==
- Babeli
- Bir Dhadoli
- Dhadoli
- Dhak Chair
- Dhak Manak
- Domeli
- Dug
- Malikpur
- Manak
- Rampur Sunran
- Sahni
