= Dug, Phagwara =

Dug
- Village
- Location in Punjab, India Dug (India)
- Coordinates: 31.326973°N 75.763313°E
- Country: India
- State: Punjab
- District: Kapurthala

Government
  - Type: Panchayati raj (India)
  - Body: Gram panchayat

Population (2011)
  - Total: 694
- Sex ratio 366/328♂/♀

Languages
  - Official: Punjabi
  - Other spoken: Hindi
- Time zone: UTC+5:30 (IST)
- PIN: 144407
- Telephone code: 01822
- ISO 3166 code: IN-PB
- Vehicle registration: PB-09
- Website: kapurthala.gov.in

Dug is a village in Phagwara Tehsil in Kapurthala district of Punjab State, India. It is located 53 kilometres (33 mi) from Kapurthala, 13 kilometres (8.1 mi) from Phagwara. The village is administrated by a Sarpanch who is an elected representative of village as per the constitution of India and Panchayati raj.

== Transport ==
Phagwara Junction Railway Station, Mauli Halt Railway Station are nearby railway stations to Dug, however, Jalandhar City Rail Way station is 23 km away from the village. The village is 118 km away from Sri Guru Ram Dass Jee International Airport in Amritsar. Another near airport is Sahnewal Airport in Ludhiana which is located 40 km away from the village. Phagwara, Jandiala, Jalandhar, Phillaur are the nearby cities to Dug village.

== Nearby villages ==
- Babeli
- Bhabiana
- Bir Dhandoli
- Dhak Dhandoli
- Dhandoli
- Domeli
- Lakhpur
- Malikpur, Phagwara
- Rampur Sunran
- Sahni
- Sangatpur
