= Wahid, Phagwara =

Wahid
- Village
- Location in Punjab, India Wahid (India)
- Coordinates: 31.276361°N 75.880264°E
- Country: India
- State: Punjab
- District: Kapurthala

Government
  - Body: Gram panchayat

Population (2011)
  - Total: 963
- Sex ratio 494/469♂/♀

Languages
  - Official: Punjabi
  - Other spoken: Hindi
- Time zone: UTC+5:30 (IST)
- PIN: 144401
- Telephone code: 01824
- ISO 3166 code: IN-PB
- Vehicle registration: PB-09
- Website: kapurthala.gov.in

Wahid is a village in Phagwara Tehsil in Kapurthala district of Punjab State, India. It is located 52 kilometres (32 mi) from Kapurthala, 15 kilometres (9.3 mi) from Phagwara. The village is administrated by a Sarpanch who is an elected representative of village as per the constitution of India and Panchayati raj.

== Transport ==
Phagwara Junction Railway Station, Mauli Halt Railway Station are the nearby railway stations to Wahid, however, Jalandhar City Rail Way station is 23 km away from the village. The village is 118 km away from Sri Guru Ram Dass Jee International Airport in Amritsar. Another near airport is Sahnewal Airport in Ludhiana which is located 40 km away from the village.

== Nearby villages ==
- Bir Khurampur
- Brahampur
- Chair
- Dhak Chair
- Dhak Malikpur
- Dhak Manak
- Manak
- Nasirabad
- Prempur
- Randhirgarh
