= Jagpalpur =

- Village
- Location in Punjab, India Jagpalpur (India)
- Coordinates: 31.3067976°N 75.7466448°E
- Country: India
- State: Punjab
- District: Kapurthala

Population (2001)
  - Total: 1,559

Languages
  - Official: Punjabi
- Time zone: UTC+5:30 (IST)
- Vehicle registration: PB-
- Coastline: 0 kilometres (0 mi)

Jagpalpur is a village in Tehsil Phagwara, Kapurthala district, in Punjab, India.

== Demographics ==
According to the 2001 Census, Jagpalpur has a population of 1,559 people. Surrounding villages include Ranipur, Ucha, Dugga, Babeli, Rampur Sunra, Sikri, Ramgarh, Barn, Kishanpur, Madhopur, Bhakhriana, Kotli Than Singh, and Bohani. The nearest police station is in Rawal Pindi.

== History ==
As Jagpalpur is part of Karputhala Punjab, it is sometimes also known as Dhak Jagpalpur. The former name of Nimane is a nickname carried forward from the village in the malwa region of Punjab.

Baba Guddarh Jagpal Ji(exact date yet to be established) was the founder of this village, who migrated from a village in Malwa and founded Jagpalpur.

Baba Guddarh Jagpal Ji and his sons had to work very hard with the constant threat of wild animals and poisonous snakes to clear the uninhabitable forest to cultivate a small farm. Subsequently, the small farm and the farmhouse expanded into a medium size village within approximately 250 years.

== Around Jagpalpur ==
The village has Gurdwaras and the Mata Sahib Kaur Girls Khalsa College.

The village is famous for its ancient building housing a disused government school. The village school was built by freedom fighter Piara Singh Langeri who was associated with the Ghadar Movement. There was a Gurdwara on the first floor.

Piara Singh Langeri encouraged setting up of schools, especially in the rural areas. The major centre of the Ghadari activity, the building from where the Government Elementary School Jagpalpur used to be run, was the hub of the meetings of freedom fighters and was the place where plans were given final shape by freedom fighters.

A report on the Ghadar movement by British Intelligence Officers, Ismongar and Slattery, titled "Ghadar Conspiracy", gives several references to the building. The Punjab government of 1919 had published the report. The building also finds mention in the book, "An Account of Ghadar" by Professor Ved Pathak.

The Ghadar leaders, operating from the area, Banta Singh Sangwal, Arur Singh Sangwal, Buta Singh Akalgarh (Ludhiana), Jawand Singh of Nangal Kalan, Ishar Singh Dhudike (Ferozepore) and Ranga Singh alias Roda Singh, were all sent to the gallows while the elder brother of Jwand Singh, had turned an approver in the case that led to the hanging of the other six including his younger brother.

Piara Singh of Langeri was captured by the British with the help of Chanda Singh, a zaildar in Nangal Kalan but the revolutionaries killed the zaildar leading them to the gallows. Hira Singh turned approver to hand the six into the hands of the British.

There is a move to have the building preserved as a national monument.

== Sports tournament ==
Jagpalpur hosts the annual sports tournament which includes holding Kabaddi matches. The 3rd Annual United Jagpalpur Sports Club Tournament will be held in the first week of February, 2010.
