= Manak, Phagwara =

Manak
- Village
- Location in Punjab, India Manak (India)
- Coordinates: 31.252940°N 75.883654°E
- Country: India
- State: Punjab
- District: Kapurthala

Government
  - Body: Gram panchayat

Population (2011)
  - Total: 902
- Sex ratio 468/434♂/♀

Languages
  - Official: Punjabi
  - Other spoken: Hindi
- Time zone: UTC+5:30 (IST)
- PIN: 144401
- Telephone code: 01824
- ISO 3166 code: IN-PB
- Vehicle registration: PB-09
- Website: kapurthala.gov.in

Manak is a village in Phagwara tehsil in Kapurthala district of Punjab State, India. It is located 51 kilometres (32 mi) from Kapurthala and 18 kilometres (11 mi) from Phagwara. The village is administrated by a Sarpanch who is an elected representative. As of the 2011 Census of India, Manak has a population of 902 spread over 186 households.

== Transport ==
Phagwara Junction and Mauli Halt are the nearest railway stations to Manak; Jalandhar City station is 23 kilometres (14 mi) away. The village is 118 kilometres (73 mi) from Sri Guru Ram Dass Jee International Airport in Amritsar and 40 kilometres (25 mi) from Sahnewal Airport in Ludhiana. Phagwara, Banga, Jalandhar, Mahilpur, Guraya, Phillaur are the nearby cities.

== Nearby villages ==
- Babeli
- Bhabiana
- Brahampur
- Chair
- Dhak Chair
- Dhak Manak
- Domeli
- Sahni
- Wahid
