= Gandhwan =

- village
- Location in Punjab, India Gandhwan (India)
- Coordinates: 31.2319586°N 75.7268715°E
- Country: India
- State: Punjab
- District: Kapurthala

Population (2001)
  - Total: 1,385

Languages
  - Official: Punjabi
- Time zone: UTC+5:30 (IST)
- Telephone code: 0091.1824
- Vehicle registration: PB-
- Coastline: 0 kilometres (0 mi)
- Nearest city: Phagwara (2.35 miles)
- Avg. summer temperature: 45 °C (113 °F)
- Avg. winter temperature: 10 °C (50 °F)

Gandhwan is a village near Hadiabad, Tehsil Phagwara, Kapurthala district, in Punjab, India.

== Demographics ==
According to the 2001 Census, Gandhwan has a population of 1,385 people. The village has 208 acres (0.84 km^{2}). Neighbouring villages include Mehtan, Narangpur, Dhak Narangshahpur, Narangshahpur, Athouli, and Hardaspur.

The village has a Gurudwara, the shrine of Baba Ghiri Ji, a bank and a primary school.
