= Brahampur, Phagwara =

Brahampur
- Village
- Location in Punjab, India Brahampur (India)
- Coordinates: 31.263764°N 75.883531°E
- Country: India
- State: Punjab
- District: Kapurthala

Government
  - Type: Panchayati raj (India)
  - Body: Gram panchayat

Population (2011)
  - Total: 475
- Sex ratio 234/241♂/♀

Languages
  - Official: Punjabi
  - Other spoken: Hindi
- Time zone: UTC+5:30 (IST)
- PIN: 144408
- Telephone code: 01822
- ISO 3166 code: IN-PB
- Vehicle registration: PB-09
- Website: kapurthala.gov.in

Brahampur is a village in Kapurthala district, in Punjab, India. It is located 15 kilometres (9.3 mi) away from the sub-district headquarters of Phagwara and 55 km away from Kapurthala.

== Transport ==
Nearby railway stations include Phagwara Junction and Mauli Halt. Sahnewal Airport in Ludhiana is located 40 km away from the village.

== Nearby villages ==
- Manak
- Chair
- Dhak Chair
- Dhak Malikpur
- Dhak Manak
- Malikpur
- Nasirabad
- Prempur
- Sahni
- Wahid
