= Dhak Chair =

- Village
- Location in Punjab, India Dhak Chair (India)
- Coordinates: 31.259791°N 75.901319°E
- Country: India
- State: Punjab
- District: Kapurthala

Government
  - Type: Panchayati raj (India)
  - Body: Gram panchayat

Population (2011)
  - Total: 59
- Sex ratio 33/26♂/♀

Languages
  - Official: Punjabi
  - Other spoken: Hindi
- Time zone: UTC+5:30 (IST)
- PIN: 144408
- Telephone code: 01822
- ISO 3166 code: IN-PB
- Vehicle registration: PB-09
- Website: kapurthala.gov.in

Dhak Chair is a village in Phagwara Tehsil in Kapurthala district of Punjab State, India. It is located 52 kilometres (32 mi) from Kapurthala, 16 kilometres (9.9 mi) from Phagwara. The village is administrated by a Sarpanch who is an elected representative of village as per the constitution of India and Panchayati raj (India).

== Demography ==
According to the report published by Census India in 2011, Dhak Chair has 9 houses with the total population of 59 persons of which 33 are male and 26 females. Literacy rate of Dhak Chair is 81.13%, higher than the state average of 75.84%. The population of children in the age group 0–6 years is 6 which is 10.17% of the total population. Child sex ratio is approximately 1000, higher than the state average of 846.

== Population data ==
Particulars	Total	Male	Female
Total No. of Houses	9	-	-
Population	59	33	26
Child (0-6)	6	3	3
Schedule Caste	38	23	15
Schedule Tribe	0	0	0
Literacy	81.13 %	86.67 %	73.91 %
Total Workers	20	20	0
Main Worker	20	0	0
Marginal Worker	0	0	0

== Nearby villages ==
- Bhabiana
- Brahampur
- Chair
- Dhak Malikpur
- Dhak Manak
- Domeli
- Malikpur
- Manak
- Sahni
- Wahid
