= Lakhpur =

- Village
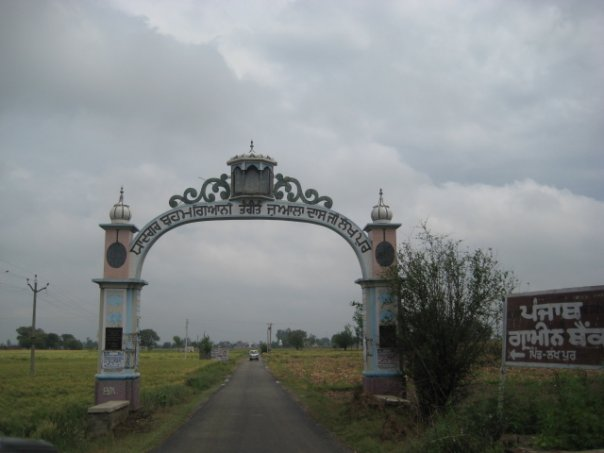

- Location in Punjab, India Lakhpur (India)
- Coordinates: 31°16′44.46″N 75°48′58.87″E
- Country: India
- State: Punjab
- District: Kapurthala

Population (2001)
  - Total: 1,892
- Vehicle registration: PB-

Lakhpur is a village near Sahni (Lakhpur-Sahni), Tehsil Phagwara, Kapurthala district, in Punjab, India.

== Demographics ==
According to the 2001 Census, Lakhpur had a population of 1,892 people. As per the 2011 Census, the population is 1,895 people. The village has 401 acres (1.62 km^{2}), of which 5 acres (20,000 m^{2}) is woodland. Lakhpur hosts the annual Dussehra Mela which can attract up to 4,000 people. Neighbouring villages include Sahni (Lakhpur-Sahni), Malikhpur, Begampur, Sangatpur, Chak Prema, Dhadday, Dhadoli and Bir Dhadoli.

== History ==
It is said that the village is named after Maa Lakhi who had two sons and one daughter. The sons' descendants are divided into two pattis (groups of families descending from one common ancestor). The pattis are the "Surjan" patti and the "Moru" patti with the surname Dhadwal or Thadwal. It is believed that Maa Lakhi's descendants have been living in Lakhpur for the past 25 generations.

Some Dhadwal families have also settled in the village of Jagatpur near Mukandpur in the district of Nawanshahr (also known as Shahid Bhagat Singh Nagar district); in Apra, near Phillaur; and Mothada Kalan, also near Phillaur.

The descendants of Maa Lakhi's daughter settled the neighbouring village of Bir Dhadoli and continue to reside in the village.

Maa Lakhi belonged to Ajnoha village near Nadalon in Hoshiarpur. Her husband's family also lived in Hoshiarpur near the present day Himachal Pradesh border. Maa Lakhi's father gave the couple land to settle on which became known as Lakhpur.

Villagers confirm that Maa Lakhi was a devotee of Bhagat Baba Kalu who lived during the 16th century and built a shrine in Panshta also known as Panchhat. Maa Lakhi took her children to the shrine, especially on the occurrence of Baisakhi. Therefore, the period when the village was settled could be at any time during the 16th century, making the village at least 400 years old.

According to local tradition, Lakhpur was already an established village at the time when Sri Guru Hargobind Sahib Ji visited Lakhpur whilst he was travelling from Kartarpur to Kiratpur Sahib. He then went to Palahi (near Phagwara) in 1635, where he was involved in a battle against the Mughals led by Ahmad Khan. It is said that Guru Ji visited Lakhpur before visiting Chak Prema and stopping at Palahi. Guru Ji also visited Domeli, Hadiabad and Phagwara where Gurdwaras have been built in memory of the visit.

== Around Lakhpur ==
The village has four Gurdwaras. The oldest, Gurdwara Sahib Guru Granth Sahib, is managed by the Shromani Gurdwara Prabandhak Committee. The dharamsal of Bhagat Jawala Dass Ji is currently being reconstructed and will be the fifth Gurdwara.

The village also has a pharmacy, a Mandir, the shrine of Lakha Datta Pir (Sakhi Sarwar), the dharamsals of Baba Ram Dass Ji, Baba Amar Dass Ji and Guru Ravidas Ji, the Baba Balak Nath Mandir and shrine of Bhagat Baba Kalu, a primary school, Government Secondary School (which runs the Galaxy Science Club), a Post Office, Shaheed Shrines, a bank, a Mosque, Jathera and some shops. The nearest railway station is in Phagwara. The nearest police station is the Rawal Pindi. police station.

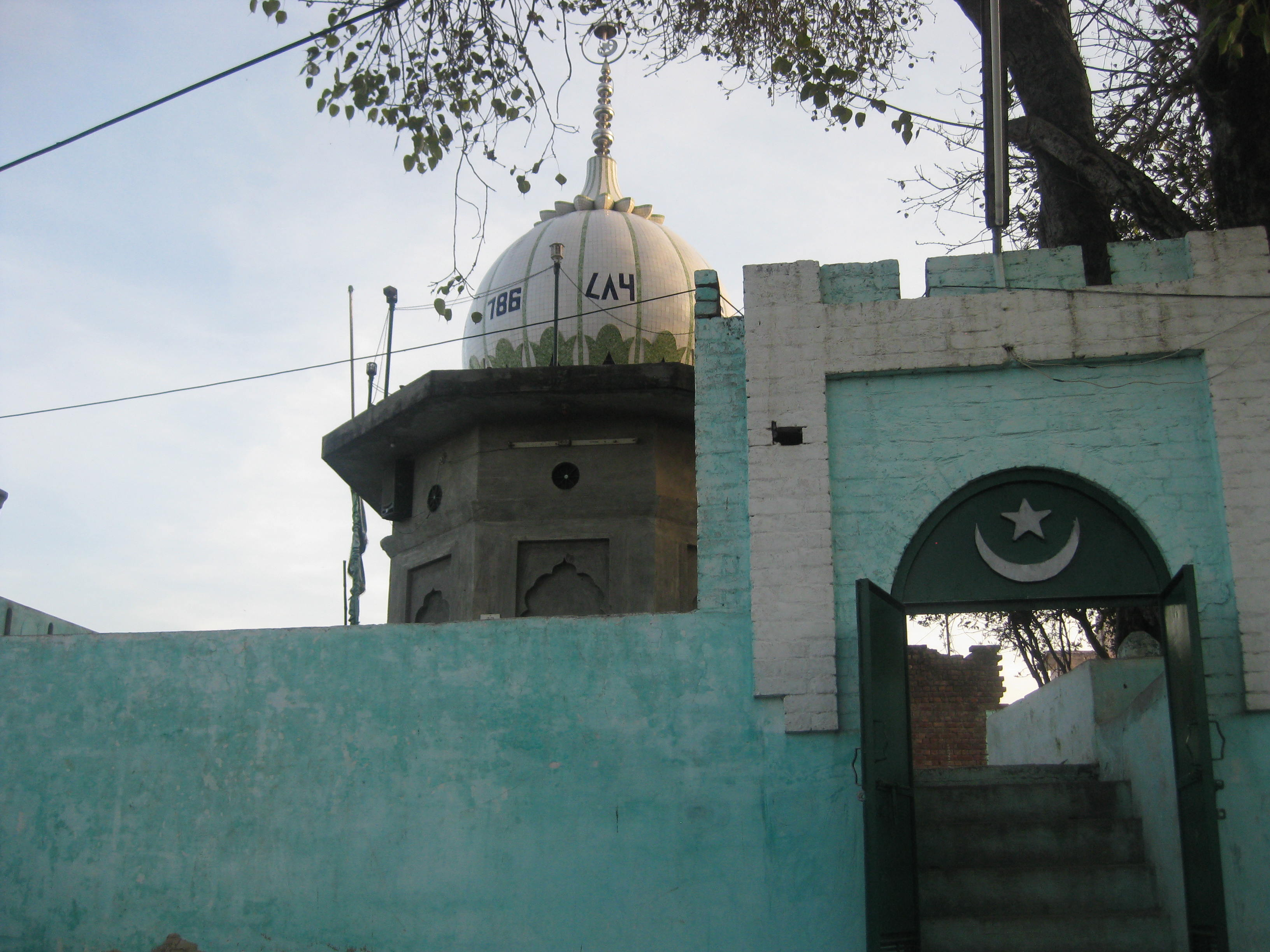
Lakhpur Mosque

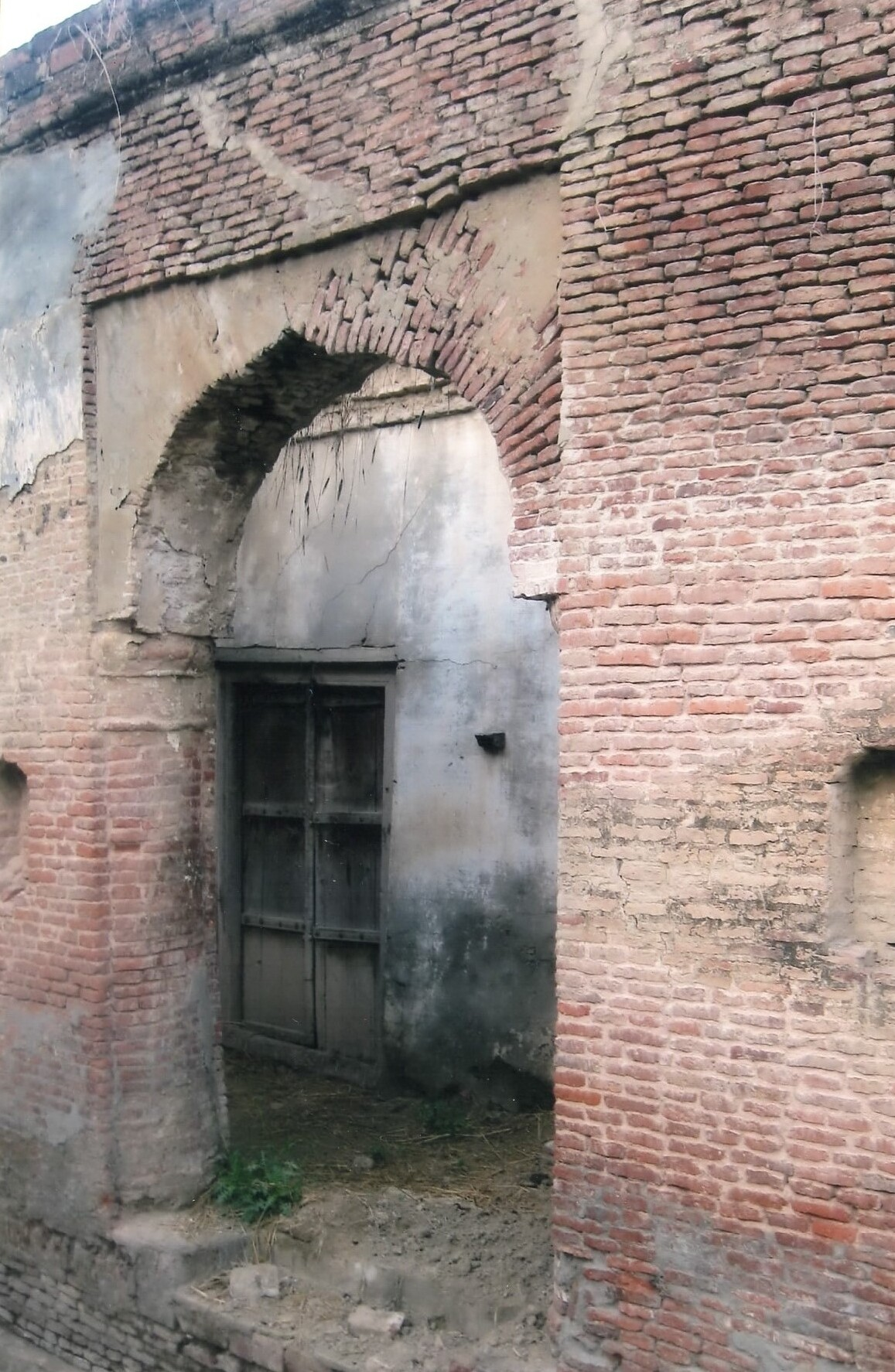
Lakhpur Serai

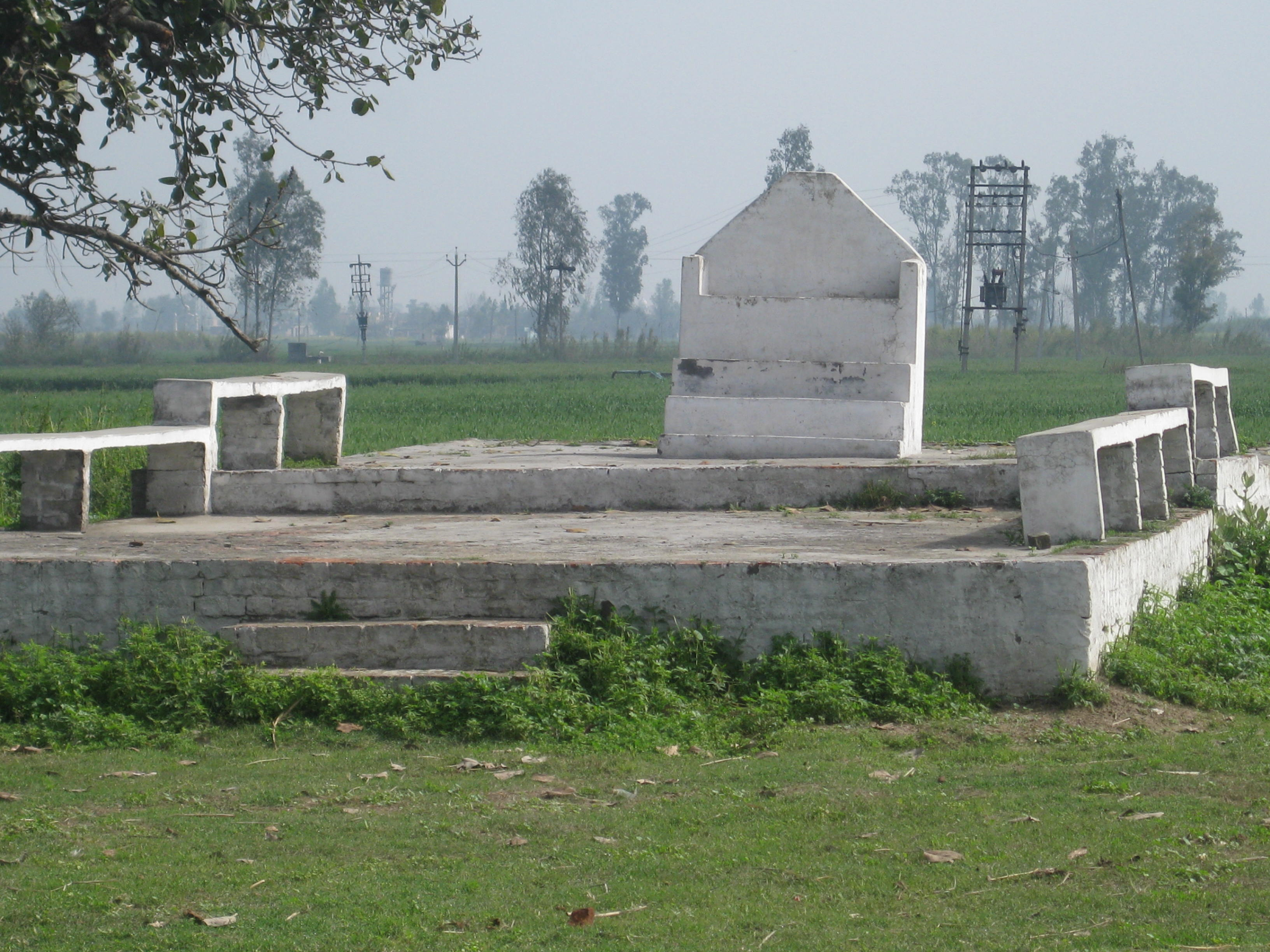
Lakhpur Dussehra Ground

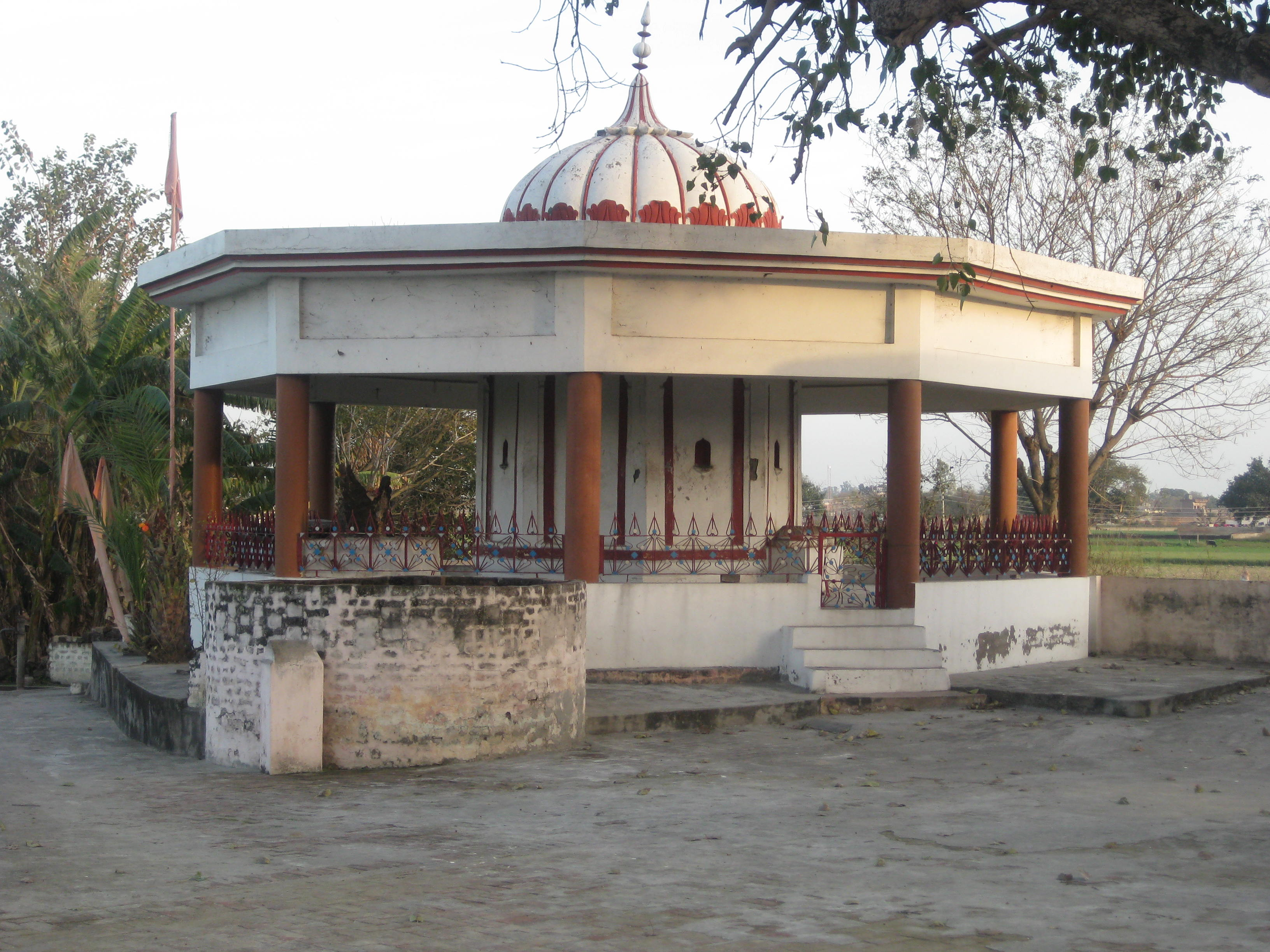
Lakhpur Baba Amar Das Ji

Lakhpur Medical Centre

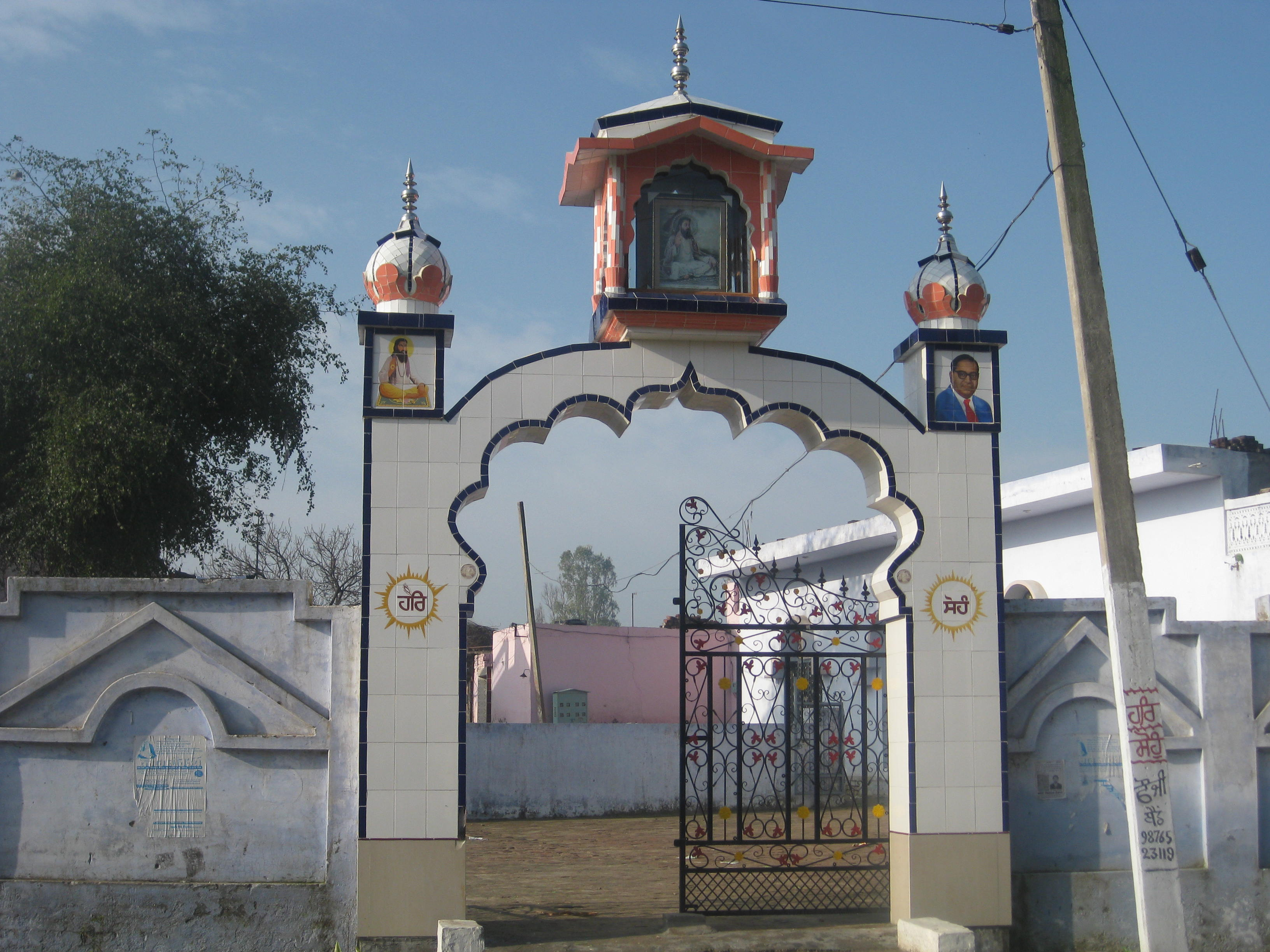
Lakhpur Guru Ravi Das Ji

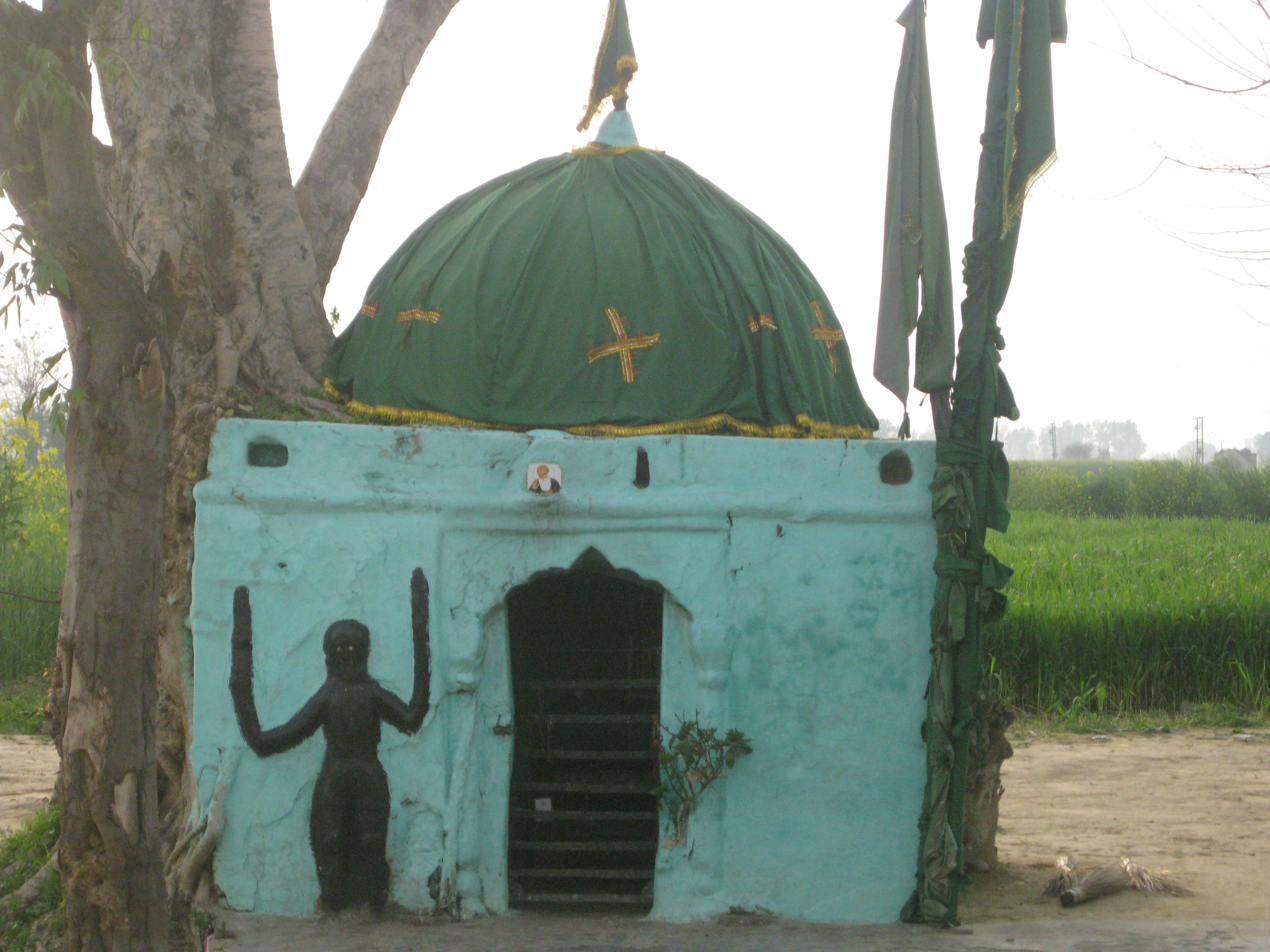
Lakha Data

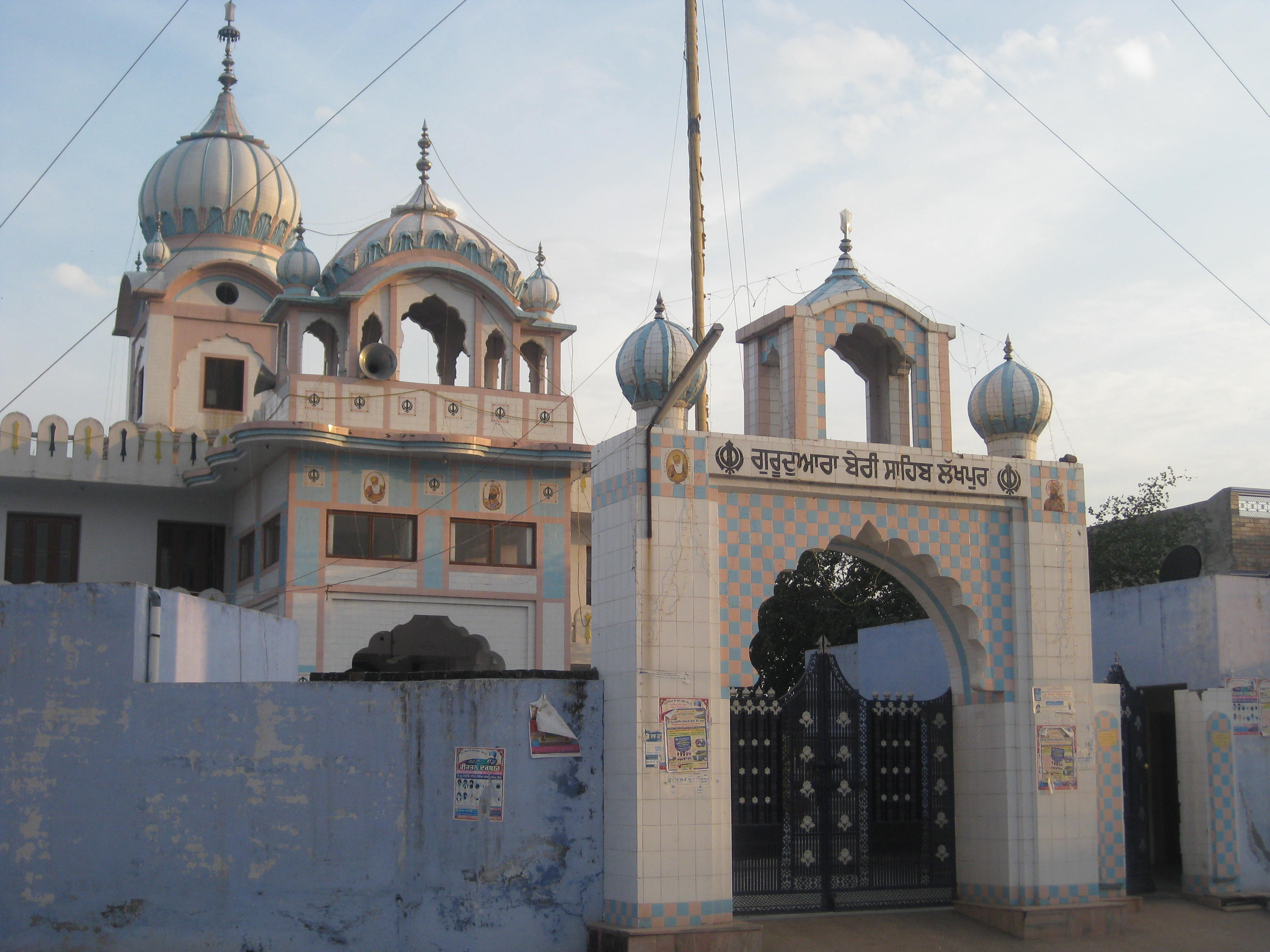
Lakhpur Gurdwara Beri Sahib Ji

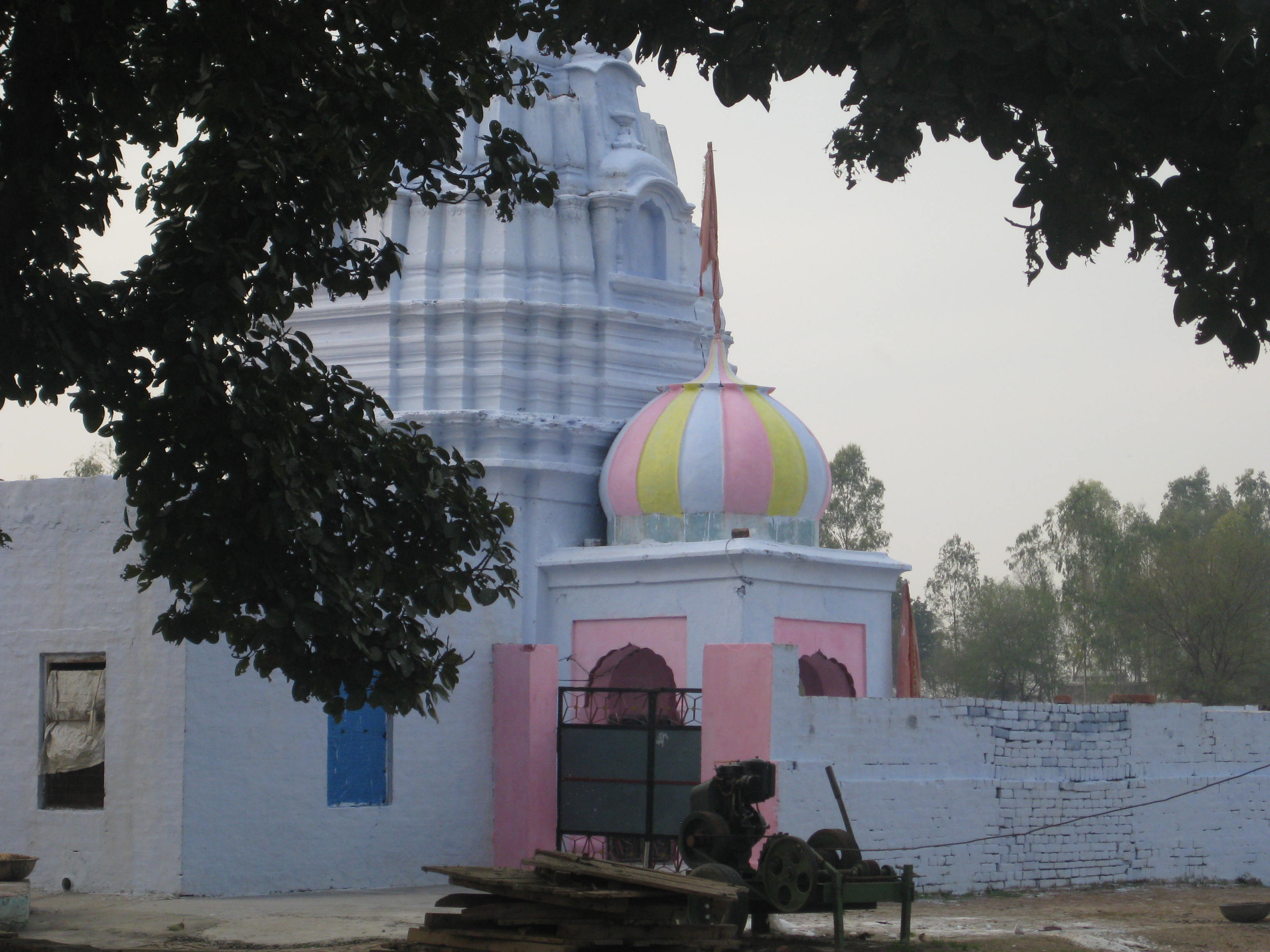
Lakhpur Shiv Duala (Mandir)

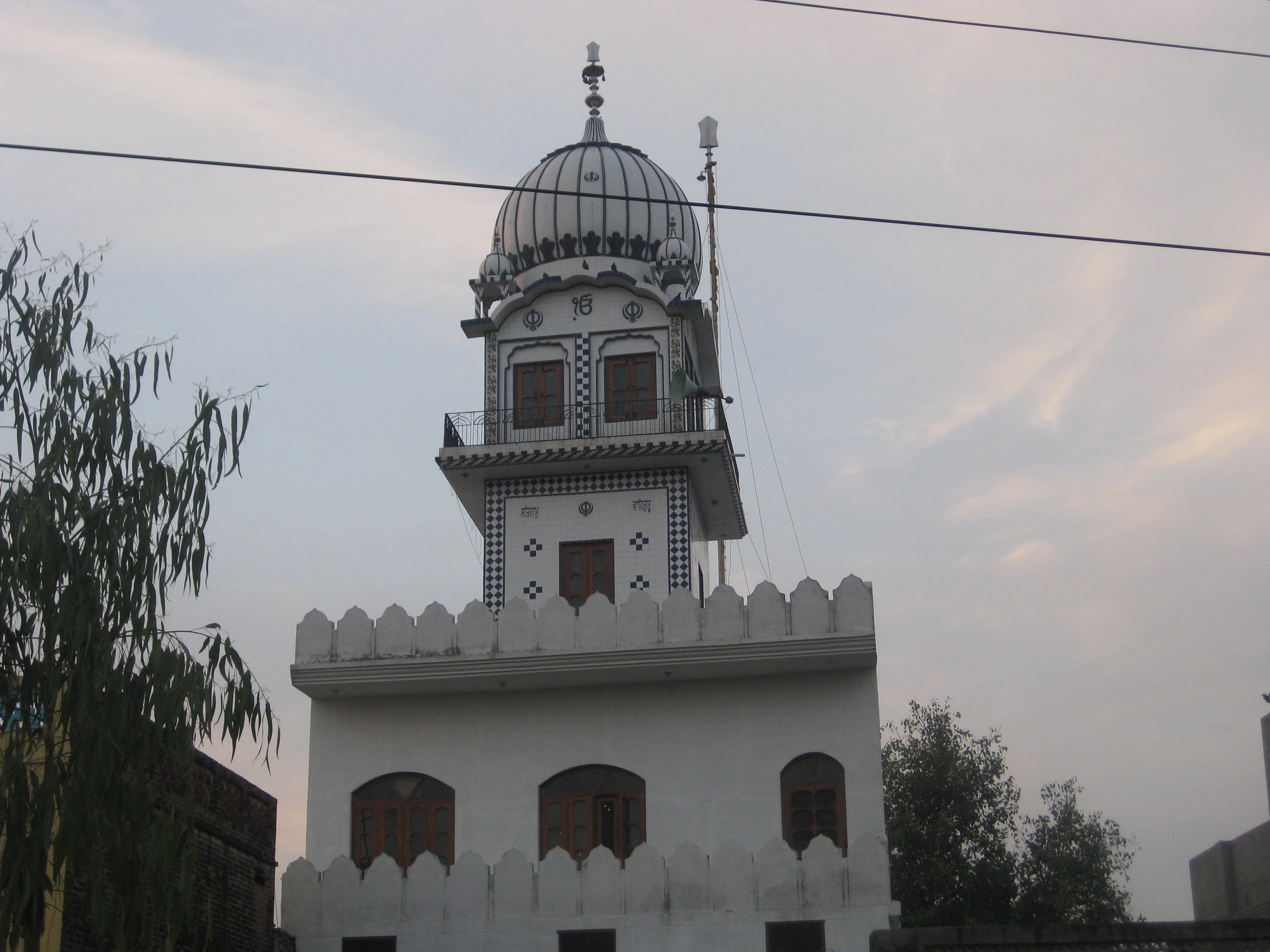
Lakhpur Gurdwara

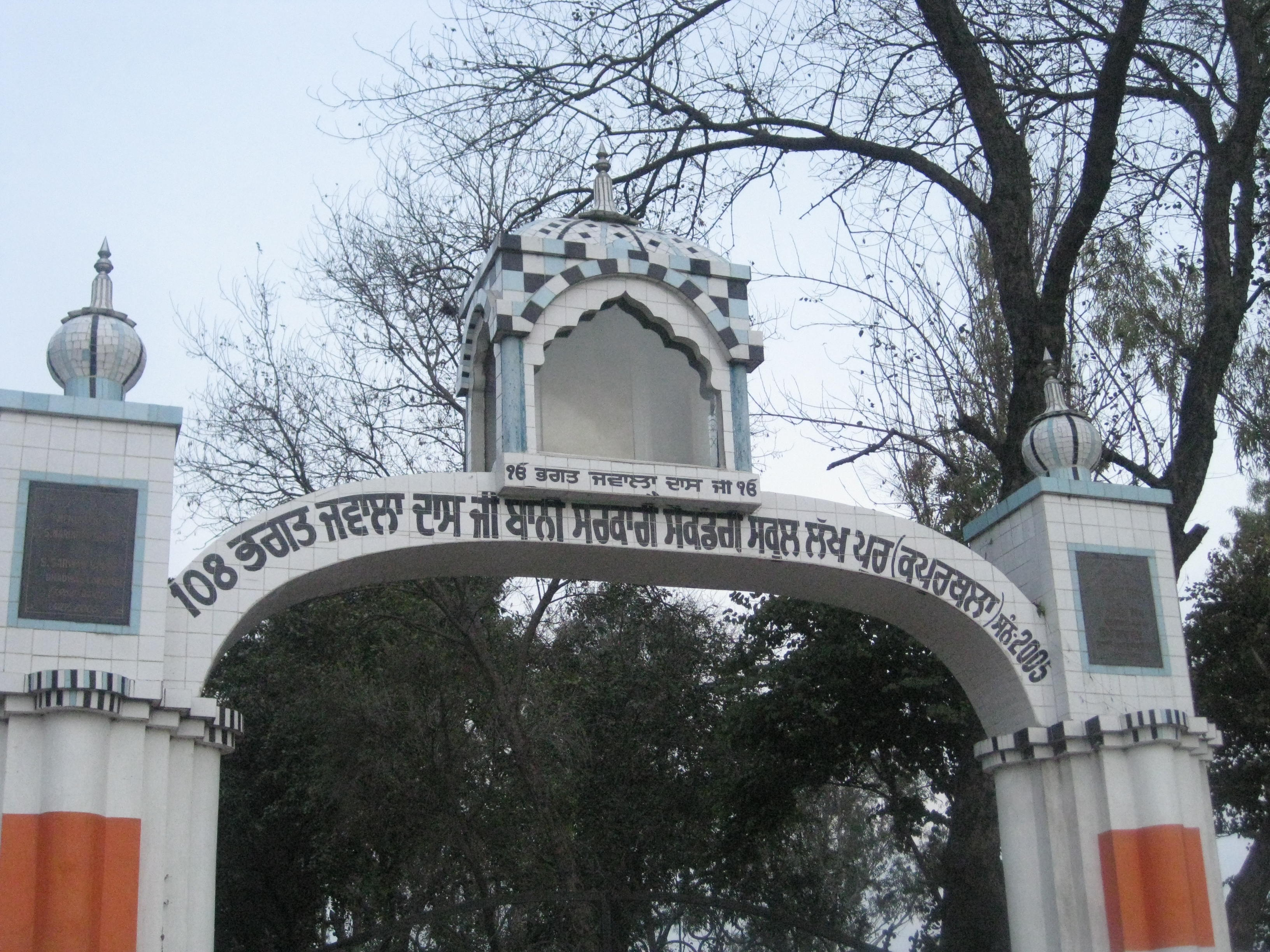
Lakhpur Senior School

== Sports tournament ==
A Kabaddi and sports tournament was hosted at the Lakhpur Government Senior Secondary School between 4 and 6 March 2011. Various villages entered the tournament which included Sangatpur, Jagpalpur, Ghumana, Manaka, Harkowal and Akalgarh.

== Religion ==
Lakhpur is a mix of Sikhs and Hindus. It also has a Muslim Gujjar and Bazigar settlement.

== Location of Lakhpur ==
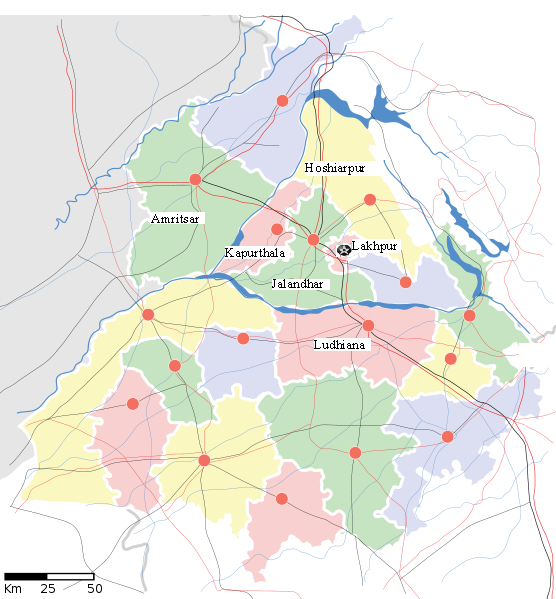
Lakhpur is located east of the Phagwara-Hoshiarpur Road. Heading north from Phagwara for 5 km, one must turn right opposite Khatti and travel for 2.2 km on the Chak Prema-Lakhpur Road.

== Gurdwara Sahib Guru Granth Sahib ==
During the times of Guru Arjan Dev Ji, the village was known as Lakhu Pur. People of the village used to go to Amritsar to pay homage to Guru Arjan Dev Ji. Remembering this, Guru Hargobind Sahib Ji and Sri Guru Har Rai Sahib Ji visited Lakhpur where they held congregations to preach about Sikhism.

The people of Lakhpur built a dharamshala on the spot where the congregations were held. Later, Gurdwara Sahib Guru Granth Sahib was built on the same exact spot.

== Chitti Bein and the Great Flood ==
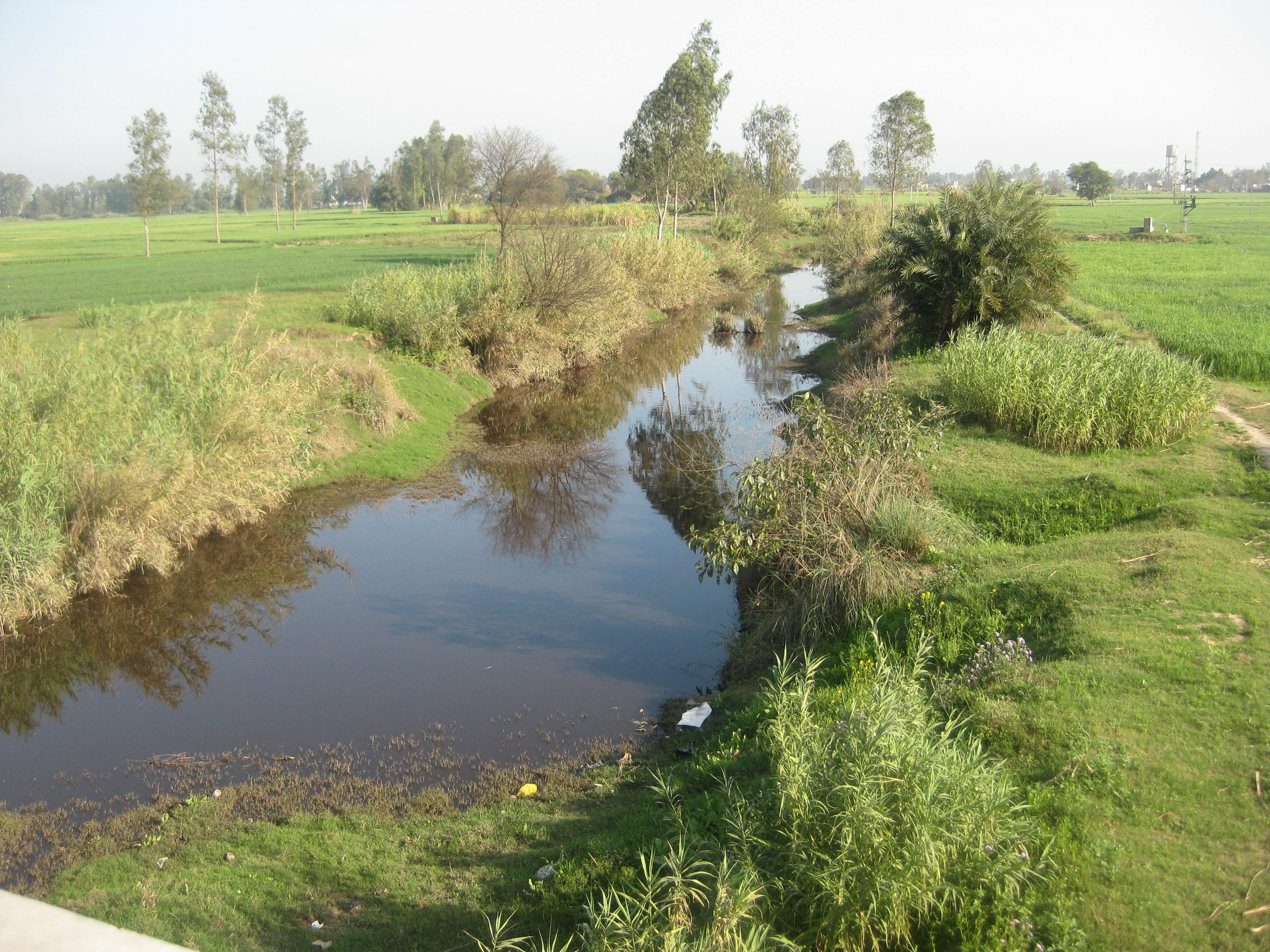
Chitti Bein by Lakhpur

The Chitti (White)Bein passes through all districts of doaba and drains into the Sutlej, near Harike in Amritsar District. It also flows near Lakhpur.

Locals recall the flood of the mid 1940s, known as the Great Flood. It is said that the Chitti Bein breached its banks at a number of places, causing severe devastation. The water reached as far as the gate of the middle part of Lakhpur.

So much damage was caused to the G.T Road near Chiheru that a new section of the Road had to be constructed.

The Chitti Bein is prone to seasonal flooding because seasonal torrent (stream)/torrents, known in Punjabi as choes, drain into it. The most famous are the Maili Choe; the Jammanwala Choe and the Nasrala Choe.

The Maili Choe takes its name from the Maili Dam near the village of Maili in Hoshiarpur District. It merges with the Chitti Bein near the village of Cheta (Nawanshahr District).

The Jamanwala Choe winds it way through Hoshiarpur district flowing near the villages of Panchhat, Narur, Nasirabad and drains into the Chitti Bein near Malikhpur. Both these choes drain into the Chitti Bein prior to flowing near Lakhpur. It is for this reason that there is wetland, near the Lakhpur woodland, which is caused when the Chitti Bein breaches its bank.

After flowing near Lakhpur, the Chitti Bein flows for some kilometres, and is joined by the Nasrala Choe which takes its name from the Nasrala bridge near the village of Nasrala on the Hoshiarpur-Jalandhar Road. It merges with the Chitti Bein near the village of Ucha. The Narur choe joins the Nasrala Choe near the village of Babeli.

== See also ==
- Sakhi Sarwar Saint
- Sakhi Sarwar
- Gugga Ji
- Bhagat Baba Kalu Ji
- Shaheed Shrine
- Phagwara
- Kapurthala
