= Dhak Manak =

- Village
- Location in Punjab, India Dhak Manak (India)
- Coordinates: 31.263130°N 75.880990°E
- Country: India
- State: Punjab
- District: Kapurthala

Government
  - Type: Panchayati raj (India)
  - Body: Gram panchayat

Population (2011)
  - Total: 22
- Sex ratio 10/12♂/♀

Languages
  - Official: Punjabi
  - Other spoken: Hindi
- Time zone: UTC+5:30 (IST)
- PIN: 144408
- Telephone code: 01822
- ISO 3166 code: IN-PB
- Vehicle registration: PB-09
- Website: kapurthala.gov.in

Dhak Manak is a village in Phagwara Tehsil in Kapurthala district of Punjab State, India. It is located 50 kilometres (31 mi) from Kapurthala, 15 kilometres (9.3 mi) from Phagwara. The village is administrated by a Sarpanch who is an elected representative of village as per the constitution of India and Panchayati raj (India).

== Demography ==
According to the report published by Census India in 2011, Dhak Manak has 5 houses with the total population of 22 persons of which 10 are male and 12 females. Literacy rate of Dhak Manak is 78.95%, higher than the state average of 75.84%. The population of children in the age group 0–6 years is 3 which is 13.64% of the total population. Child sex ratio is approximately 2000, higher than the state average of 846.

== Population data ==
| Particulars | Total | Male | Female |
|---|---|---|---|
| Total No. of Houses | 5 | - | - |
| Population | 22 | 10 | 12 |
| Child (0-6) | 3 | 1 | 2 |
| Schedule Caste | 0 | 0 | 0 |
| Schedule Tribe | 0 | 0 | 0 |
| Literacy | 78.95 % | 88.89 % | 70.00 % |
| Total Workers | 7 | 7 | 0 |
| Main Worker | 4 | 0 | 0 |
| Marginal Worker | 3 | 3 | 0 |

== Nearby villages ==
- Babeli
- Bhabiana
- Brahampur
- Chair
- Dhak Chair
- Domeli
- Dug
- Malikpur
- Manak
- Sahni
