= Malikhpur =

Malikpur
- Village
- Country: India
- State: Punjab
- District: Kapurthala
- Elevation: 245 m (804 ft)

Population (2011)
  - Total: 1,487

Languages
  - Official: Punjabi
- Time zone: UTC+5:30 (IST)
- PIN: 144405
- Telephone code: 01824
- Vehicle registration: PB-09

Malikpur is a village in Phagwara Tehsil in Kapurthala district in the Indian state of Punjab.

== Demographics ==
As of 2011 India Census Malikhpur had a population of 1,487 people in 487 households. Male constitutes 52& and females 47% of the total population. Malikpur has an average literacy rate of 31%, lower than the national average of 74%. Male and female literacy, both is 50%. In Malikpur, 11.82% of the population is under 6 years of age. The village has 449 acres (1.82 km^{2}). Neighbouring villages include Sahni (Lakhpur-Sahni), Lakhpur, Begampur, Sangatpur, Mahliana, Wahid, Toderpur, Nasirabad, Rampur Khalyan and Prempur.

The boundary between Phagwara and Hoshiarpur district lies between Malikhpur and Toderpur. The Chitti (White) Bein flows through Malikhpur and is joined by the Jammanwala choe (seasonal river).
