= Dhadday =

Dhadday Dr Ambedkar Pind
- Village
- Location in Punjab, India Dhadday (India)
- Coordinates: 31.2773°N 75.7959°E
- Country: India
- State: Punjab
- District: Kapurthala

Population (2001)
  - Total: 1,068

Languages
  - Official: Punjabi
- Time zone: UTC+5:30 (IST)
- PIN: 144407
- Telephone code: 0091.1824
- Vehicle registration: PB-
- Coastline: 0 kilometres (0 mi)
- Nearest city: Phagwara (4 miles)
- Avg. summer temperature: 45 °C (113 °F)
- Avg. winter temperature: 10 °C (50 °F)

Dhadday is a village near Lakhpur Tehsil Phagwara, Kapurthala district, in Punjab, India.

== Demographics ==
According to the 2001 Census, Dhadday has a population of 1,068 people. Neighbouring villages include Lakhpur, Bir Dhadoli, Dhadoli, Chak Prema, Wariah, Gulabgarh, Khatti, and Sangatpur. The nearest police station is at Rawalpindi and Phagwara. Not far from the village, a military airfield was successfully constructed in 2000. Small planes land and take off from the airfield daily which can be visibly seen from rooftops in the village. The postal code for the village is 144407 and main post office is at Rawal Pindi.
