= Khangura, Phagwara =

Khangura
- Village
- Location in Punjab, India Khangura (India)
- Coordinates: 31.249417°N 75.752412°E
- Country: India
- State: Punjab
- District: Kapurthala

Government
  - Type: Panchayati raj (India)
  - Body: Gram panchayat

Population (2011)
  - Total: 806
- Sex ratio 411/395♂/♀

Languages
  - Official: Punjabi
  - Other spoken: Hindi
- Time zone: UTC+5:30 (IST)
- PIN: 144401
- Telephone code: 01822
- ISO 3166 code: IN-PB
- Vehicle registration: PB-09
- Website: kapurthala.gov.in

Khangura is a village in Phagwara tehsil in Kapurthala district of Punjab State, India. It is located 38 kilometres (24 mi) from Kapurthala and 2 kilometres (1.2 mi) from Phagwara. The village is administrated by a Sarpanch who is an elected representative of village.

== Transport ==
Phagwara Junction and Mauli Halt are the closest railway stations to Khangura. The station at Jalandhar City is 23 kilometres (14 mi) away. The village is 118 kilometres (73 mi) from Sri Guru Ram Dass Jee International Airport in Amritsar. Another nearby facility is Sahnewal Airport in Ludhiana, 40 kilometres (25 mi) distant. Phagwara, Jandiala, Jalandhar, Phillaur are the nearby cities to Khangura village.
