= Nihalgarh, Phagwara =

Nihalgarh
- Village
- Location in Punjab, India Nihalgarh (India)
- Coordinates: 31.538019°N 75.408251°E
- Country: India
- State: Punjab
- District: Kapurthala

Government
  - Type: Panchayati raj (India)
  - Body: Gram panchayat

Population (2011)
  - Total: 590
- Sex ratio 307/283♂/♀

Languages
  - Official: Punjabi
  - Other spoken: Hindi
- Time zone: UTC+5:30 (IST)
- PIN: 144401
- Telephone code: 01822
- ISO 3166 code: IN-PB
- Vehicle registration: PB-09
- Website: kapurthala.gov.in

Nihalgarh is a village located in Phagwara Tehsil, Kapurthala district in Punjab, India. It is located 48 kilometres (30 mi) from Kapurthala and 8 kilometres (5.0 mi) from Phagwara. The village is administered by a sarpanch, an elected representative.

== Demography ==
As of 2011, Nihalgarh has 92 houses with a population of 479 people, with 250 men and 229 women. The literacy rate of Nihalgarh is 78.14%, higher than the state average of 75.84%. Children 0–6 years number 49, which is 10.23% of the total population. The child sex ratio is approximately 1130, higher than the state average of 846.

== Transport ==
The nearest railway stations to Nihalgarh are Phagwara Junction Railway Station and Mauli Halt Railway Station. Jalandhar Railway station is 24 km away from the village. Nihalgarh is 117 km away from Sri Guru Ram Dass Jee International Airport in Amritsar, while Ludhiana Airport is located 37 km away. Phagwara, Jandiala, Jalandhar, and Phillaur are the closest urban centres to Nihalgarh.
