= Mehtiana =

Mehtiana, Punjab
- Village
- Mehtiana
- Location in Punjab, India Mehtiana, Punjab (India)
- Coordinates: 31.372942°N 75.820618°E
- Country: India
- State: Punjab
- District: Hoshiarpur
- Founder: Unknown
- Grampanchyat: Government office

Government
  - Type: Local Government
  - Body: Panchayati Raj/Govt. of Punjab/Govt. of India
- Elevation: 296 m (971 ft)
  - Density: 600/km^{2} (1,600/sq mi)

Indians
  - Punjabi/hindus/Sikhs: Punjabi, Hindi
- Time zone: UTC+5:30 (IST)
- PIN: 146001
- Telephone code: 01886
- Vehicle registration: PB- 07

Mehtiana is a village in Hoshiarpur district. District headquarters Hoshiarpur is about 18.4 kilometres from the village. Punjabi is the widely spoken language in the area. Hoshiarpur and Phagwara are nearby cities. It is connected via NH344B road. It is a modern village with facilities like electricity, medical clinic (private), schools (government, private), bus facility, etc. Mount Carmel School, Mehtiana is a major school in area. GNA Group, Mehtiana is a major source of employment for the area.

== Location ==
Mehtiana village is situated between Phagwara and Hoshiarpur stretch of National Highway 344B in Hoshiarpur II Tehsil in the state of Punjab. This village is 19 kilometres from Hoshiarpur and 15 kilometres from Adampur.

== Nearby ==
Hoshiarpur, Phagwara, Adampur are the nearby cities to Mehtiana and some nearby village are Simbli and Rehana Jattan.
