= Harbanspur =

Harbanspur is a village in Kapurthala District of Punjab, India. This village also known as "Jagjitpur". Neighbouring villages are Bhabiana, Prempur, Sahni, Rawalpindi, Rehana jattan, etc. The population of this village is around 1500.This village has got 95% population of Sikh Rajput caste and 5% belongs to schedule caste.This village is not much developed due to lack of education, very few people doing government service. It is situated on Phagwara to Hoshiarpur Road.the jagjitpur name given by maharaja jagjit singh Kapurthala. Nri money is the most of income resources for this village.
