= Kishan Pur =

- Village
- Location in Punjab, India Kishan Pur (India)
- Coordinates: 31.278304°N 75.741510°E
- Country: India
- State: Punjab
- District: Kapurthala

Government
  - Type: Panchayati raj (India)
  - Body: Gram panchayat

Population (2011)
  - Total: 471
- Sex ratio 226/245♂/♀

Languages
  - Official: Punjabi
  - Other spoken: Hindi
- Time zone: UTC+5:30 (IST)
- PIN: 144401
- Telephone code: 01822
- ISO 3166 code: IN-PB
- Vehicle registration: PB-09
- Website: kapurthala.gov.in

Kishan Pur is a village in Phagwara Tehsil in Kapurthala district of Punjab State, India. It is located 33 kilometres (21 mi) from Kapurthala, 4 kilometres (2.5 mi) from Phagwara. The village is administrated by a Sarpanch who is an elected representative of village as per the constitution of India and Panchayati raj (India).

== Transport ==
Phagwara Junction Railway Station and Mauli Halt Railway Station are the nearby railway stations to Kishan Pur, while Jalandhar City Railway station is 23 km away from the village. The village is 118 km away from Sri Guru Ram Dass Jee International Airport in Amritsar and the other nearest airport is Sahnewal Airport in Ludhiana which is located 40 km away from the village. Phagwara, Jandiala, Jalandhar, Phillaur are the nearby cities to Kishan Pur village.
