= Vijay Dutt Shridhar =

Indian journalist

- Born: Bohani
- Occupation(s): Journalist, writer
- Spouse: Nirmala shridhar
- Children: Gaurav shridhar Vaibhav shridhar Vivek shridhar Garima shroti
- Parent: Shri Sundarlal Shridhar.
- Awards: Padma Shri; Bhartendu Harishchandra Award

Vijay Dutt Shridhar is an Indian journalist, writer and the founder of Madhav Sapre Museum of Newspapers and Research Institute. He was honored by the Government of India, in 2012, with the fourth highest Indian civilian award of Padma Shri.

== Biography ==
Vijay Dutt Shridhar was born in the Indian state of Madhya Pradesh. He is a former director of Makhanlal Chaturvedi National University of Journalism and Communication and has served as the editor of Navbharat Times, a national daily in Hindi. He has also been a member of the Press Gallery Committee of Madhya Pradesh Vidhan Sabha for around 20 years.

Shridhar founded Madhavrao Sapre Samachar Patra Sangrahalaya evam Shodh Sansthan (Madhavrao Sapre Museum of Newspapers and Research Institute), a museum and research institute, in Bhopal in 1984. The institution started in a small rented place with the journals, newspapers and periodicals totaling 73 in number, donated by his teacher, Rameshwar Guru, has, over the years, grown to be housed in an 11,000 sq. ft facility holding 17,000 titles. It has since been approved by many universities as a research centre for journalism related studies and is funded by the state and central governments.

Vijay Dutt Shridhar, who is involved in social activism, has authored four books, Bhartiya Patrakarita Kosh, a 2 volume chronicle of the history of journalism in the Indian subcontinent from 1780 till 1947, Shabd Satta a historical narrative of 150 years of journalism in Madhya Pradesh, and the third one, Choutha Padav, the history of Bhopal covering 1000 years. His latest work, Pahela Sampadkiya, is an anthology of editorials appeared in various Hindi newspapers with Shridhar's commentary.

Shridhar received the Bhartendu Harishchandra Award for his work, Pehla Sampadakiya, in the Mass Communications and Journalism category in 2011. The next year, in 2012, the Government of India awarded him the civilian honour of Padma Shri.

== See also ==
- M C N University of Journalism and Communication
