= Paras Rampur =

- village
- Location in Punjab, India Paras Rampur (India)
- Coordinates: 31°19′26″N 75°40′29″E
- Country: India
- State: Punjab

Area
  - Total: 200 km^{2} (77 sq mi)

Population (2011)
  - Total: 1,631
  - Density: 8.2/km^{2} (21/sq mi)

Languages
  - Official: Punjabi
- Time zone: UTC+5:30 (IST)
- Vehicle registration: PB-
- Coastline: 0 kilometres (0 mi)
- Nearest city: Jalandhar
- Sex ratio: 1.04 ♂/♀

Paras Rampur is a village in Jalandhar district in the Indian state of Punjab. It is about five miles east of Jalandhar town.

== Demographics ==
As of 2011 India census, Paras Rampur had a population of 1631 in 360 households. Male constitutes 51% and females 49% of the total population. Paras Rampur has an average literacy rate of 77%, higher than the national average of 74%. In Paras Rampur, 7.78% of the population is under 6 years of age.

== Geography ==
The village has 200 acres (0.81 km^{2}). Neighbouring villages include Talhan, Kotli Than Singh, Chandpur, Muzaffarpur and Puranpur.

== Shaheed Banda Singh Bahadur Ji ==
Parasrampur hosts the annual Shaheed Banda Singh Bahadur Ji Jor Mela which is a big attraction in Jalandhar. Paras Rampur is famous for its Shaheedi Jor Mela which is held annually in the memory of Shaheed Banda Singh Bahadur Ji.

The Baba Lodhiana Youth Sports Club (Regd.) constructed a sports stadium on 4 acres (16,000 m^{2}) of land in Parasrampur. The stadium hosts the annual three day sports and cultural event in November and hosts the Mata Chanan Kaur Dhanoa Punjab Sports Championship which form part of the Shaheedi Jor Mela.

The Mata Chanan Kaur Dhanoa Punjab Sports Championship includes Kabaddi, wrestling, athletics, volleyball, body building championships, weightlifting, dog racing and bullock cart racing. Kabaddi Players receive the largest cash prizes ever awarded at this tournament. After the sporting events have concluded, a programme of cultural entertainment continues late into the night.

The annual 3 day festival attracts more than 4,000 sportsmen and women from all over the world.

Parasrampur is famous for its Shaheed Banda Singh Bahadur Ji Gurdwara.
