= KFY =

KFY or kfy can refer to:

- Kumaoni language, a language spoken in Uttarakhand state, India as well as in western Nepal, by ISO 639 code
- Korn Ferry, an American management consulting firm, by New York Stock Exchange ticker
- Triatominae, a subfamily of bugs, by Catalogue of Life identifier
- Karapgaon, a train station near Bohani village, Madhya Pradesh, India
