= Chak Mughlani =

Coordinates: 31°08′N 75°31′E

- Village
- Interactive map of Chak Mughlani
- Country: India
- State: Punjab
- District: Jalandhar
- Tehsil: Nakodar

Government
  - Sarpanch: Sh. Surinder Pal +91-98769-24133

Population (2011)
  - Total: 1,082

Languages
  - Official: Punjabi
  - Regional: Punjabi
- Time zone: UTC+5:30 (IST)
- PIN: 144042
- Telephone code: 01821
- Vehicle registration: PB- 08
- Nearest city: Nakodar

Chak Muglani is a village in the Nakodar tehsil of Jalandhar district in the Indian state of East Punjab.

== Description ==
Chak Muglani is one of the oldest villages in region. It is located about 4 km from Nakodar and about 28 km from Phagwara, on the Nakodar-Jandiala Road. The nearest Railway station is Shankar Railway station about 2 km away. The area is famous for dargah Mirza Junglee Peer, located in this village. A Tata Motors factory lies on the main road.

== Education ==
The village is famous for its Football Team Dashmesh Youth Sports Club. The village has a middle school that is affiliated to PSEB. Students from nearby villages including Majjafarpur and Sarakpur study there. As of Village Elections July 2013 SAD candidate Sh. Surindar Pal defeat opposition CONG candidate Gurpreet Singh by 13 votes. Baldev Singh Kainth won without by any opposition in Ward No. 6, Guljindar Singh Hayer defeat Jaswant Singh by 17 votes in Ward No. 7 and Ram Lubhaya also won by some votes in Ward No. 5.
