= Rampur Khalian =

- Village
- Location in Punjab, India Rampur Khalian (India)
- Coordinates: 31.310533°N 75.831970°E
- Country: India
- State: Punjab
- District: Kapurthala

Government
  - Type: Panchayati raj (India)
  - Body: Gram panchayat

Population (2011 681 341 340)
  - Total: 681
- Sex ratio 341/340♂/♀

Languages
  - Official: Punjabi
  - Other spoken: Hindi
- Time zone: UTC+5:30 (IST)
- PIN: 144408
- Telephone code: 01822
- ISO 3166 code: IN-PB
- Vehicle registration: PB-09
- Website: kapurthala.gov.in

Rampur Khalyan is a village in Phagwara Tehsil in Kapurthala district of Punjab State, India. It is located 55 kilometres (34 mi) from Kapurthala, 15 kilometres (9.3 mi) from Phagwara. The village is administrated by a Sarpanch, who is an elected representative.

== Transport ==
Phagwara Junction and Mauli Halt are the closest railway stations to Rampur Khalyan; Jalandhar City railway station is 23 km (14 mi) distant. The village is 118 km from Sri Guru Ram Dass Jee International Airport in Amritsar and the closest airport is Sahnewal Airport in Ludhiana which is located 40 km away from the village. Phagwara, Jandiala, Jalandhar, Phillaur are the nearby cities.
