= Man, Phagwara =

Man
- Village
- Location in Punjab, India Man (India)
- Coordinates: 31.209748°N 75.729881°E
- Country: India
- State: Punjab
- District: Kapurthala

Government
  - Type: Panchayati raj (India)
  - Body: Gram panchayat

Population (2011)
  - Total: 794
- Sex ratio 408/386♂/♀

Languages
  - Official: Punjabi
  - Other spoken: Hindi
- Time zone: UTC+5:30 (IST)
- PIN: 144401
- Telephone code: 01822
- ISO 3166 code: IN-PB
- Vehicle registration: PB-09
- Website: kapurthala.gov.in

Man is a village in Phagwara Tehsil in Kapurthala district of Punjab State, India. It is located 39 kilometres (24 mi) from Kapurthala, 3 kilometres (1.9 mi) from Phagwara. The village is administrated by a Sarpanch who is an elected representative.

Nearby cities include Phagwara, Jandiala, JalandharPandhillaur.

== Transport ==
Rail: Close to the village are Phagwara Junction and Mauli Halt railway stations. Jalandhar City railway station is 23 km away from Man.

Air: The nearest airport is Ludhiana Airport, 40 km distant in the city of Ludhiana. Sri Guru Ram Dass Jee International Airport is 118 km away, located in Amritsar.
