= Samrai =

Census town in Punjab, India

- Census town
- Location in Punjab, India Samrai (India)
- Coordinates: 31.1779818°N 75.6258594°E
- Country: India
- State: Punjab
- District: Jalandhar

Government
  - Type: Panchayat raj
  - Body: Gram panchayat
- Elevation: 240 m (790 ft)

Population (2011)
  - Total: 5,408
- Sex ratio 2782/2686 ♂/♀

Languages
  - Official: Punjabi
- Time zone: UTC+5:30 (IST)
- PIN: 144032
- ISO 3166 code: IN-PB
- Vehicle registration: PB- 08
- Website: jalandhar.nic.in

Samrai (Locally known as "Samrama") is a census town in Jalandhar district of Punjab State, India. It is located 3.1 km (1.9 mi) from Jandiala Manjki, 15.5 km from Phagwara, 19.7 km from the district headquarters at Jalandhar and 143 km from the state capital at Chandigarh. The village is administrated by a sarpanch who is an elected representative.

== Transport ==
Jalandhar railway station is the nearest train station; however, Phagwara Junction train station is 16.5 km away from the village. The village is 55.3 km away from domestic airport in Ludhiana and the nearest international airport is located in Chandigarh also Sri Guru Ram Dass Jee International Airport is the second nearest airport which is (115.0 km) via NH3 away in Amritsar.
