= Chak Prema =

- village
- Location in Punjab, India Chak Prema (India)
- Coordinates: 31.2694°N 75.8029°E
- Country: India
- State: Punjab
- District: Kapurthala

Population (2001)
  - Total: 621

Languages
  - Official: Punjabi
- Time zone: UTC+5:30 (IST)
- Vehicle registration: PB-
- Coastline: 0 kilometres (0 mi)

Chak Prema is a village in Punjab, Tehsil Phagwara, Kapurthala district. The Gate to Lakhpur is located near this village. Neighbouring villages include Lakhpur, Sangatpur, Dhadday, Dhadoli, Bir Dhadoli, Wariah, Gulabgarh and Khatti.

According to the 2001 Census, Chak Prema has a population of 621 people. The village has some shops, the Gurdwara Jhanda Sahib marking the spot where Sri Guru Hargobind Sahib Ji and Sri Guru Har Rai visited the village and is locally known for the Shiv Bhagwati Mandir.
