= Madhopur, Phagwara =

Madhopur
- Village
- Location in Punjab, India Madhopur (India)
- Coordinates: 31.284374°N 75.711357°E
- Country: India
- State: Punjab
- District: Kapurthala

Government
  - Type: Panchayati raj (India)
  - Body: Gram panchayat

Population (2011)
  - Total: 2,036
- Sex ratio 1002/1034♂/♀

Languages
  - Official: Punjabi
  - Other spoken: Hindi
- Time zone: UTC+5:30 (IST)
- PIN: 144401
- Telephone code: 01822
- ISO 3166 code: IN-PB
- Vehicle registration: PB-09
- Website: kapurthala.gov.in

Madhopur is a village in Phagwara tehsil in Kapurthala district of Punjab State, India. It is located 40 kilometres (25 mi) from Kapurthala and 8 kilometres (5.0 mi) from Phagwara. The village is administrated by a Sarpanch who is an elected representative.

== Transport ==
Jalandhar Cantonment and Chiheru Railway Station are the closest railway stations; Jalandhar City railway station is 13 kilometres (8.1 mi) away. The village is 108 kilometres (67 mi) from Sri Guru Ram Dass Jee International Airport in Amritsar and Sahnewal Airport in Ludhiana is 49 kilometres (30 mi) distant. Phagwara, Jandiala, Jalandhar, and Kartarpur are the nearby cities.
