= Naroor, Phagwara =

Naroor
- Village
- Location in Punjab, India Naroor (India)
- Coordinates: 31.332465°N 75.862110°E
- Country: India
- State: Punjab
- District: Kapurthala

Government
  - Type: Panchayati raj (India)
  - Body: Gram panchayat

Population (2011)
  - Total: 2,846
- Sex ratio 1446/1400♂/♀

Languages
  - Official: Punjabi
  - Other spoken: Hindi
- Time zone: UTC+5:30 (IST)
- PIN: 144408
- Telephone code: 01822
- ISO 3166 code: IN-PB
- Vehicle registration: PB-09
- Website: kapurthala.gov.in

Naroor is a village in Phagwara Tehsil in Kapurthala district of Punjab State, India. It is located 60 kilometres (37 mi) from Kapurthala, 22 kilometres (14 mi) from Phagwara. The village is administrated by a Sarpanch who is an elected representative of village as per the constitution of India and Panchayati raj.

== Transport ==
There is no railway station near to Naroor village in less than 10 km. Jalandhar City Railway Station is major railway station 27 km near to the village. The village is 119 km away from Sri Guru Ram Dass Jee International Airport in Amritsar. Another nearby airport is Sahnewal Airport in Ludhiana which is located 52 km away from the village. The cities of Phagwara, Jandiala, Jalandhar, and Hoshiarpur are near Naroor village.
