= Maio Patti =

Maio Patti (Mayopatti, Mayo Patti)
- Village
- Location in Punjab, India Maio Patti (Mayopatti, Mayo Patti) (India)
- Coordinates: 31.315009°N 75.856300°E
- Country: India
- State: Punjab
- District: Kapurthala

Government
  - Type: Panchayati raj (India)
  - Body: Gram panchayat

Population (2011)
  - Total: 664
- Sex ratio 353/311♂/♀

Languages
  - Official: Punjabi
  - Other spoken: Hindi
- Time zone: UTC+5:30 (IST)
- PIN: 144405
- Telephone code: 01824
- ISO 3166 code: IN-PB
- Vehicle registration: PB-09
- Website: kapurthala.gov.in

Maio Patti (Mayopatti, Mayo Patti) is a village in Phagwara Tehsil in Kapurthala district of Punjab State, India. It is located 60 kilometres (37 mi) from Kapurthala, 24 kilometres (15 mi) from Phagwara. The village is administrated by a Sarpanch, who is an elected representative.

== Transport ==
Phagwara Junction Railway Station, Mauli Halt Railway Station are the nearby railway stations to Maio Patti. Jalandhar City Rail Way Station is 23 km away from the village. The village is 118 km away from Sri Guru Ram Dass Jee International Airport in Amritsar. Another nearby airport is Sahnewal Airport in Ludhiana which is located 40 km away from the village. Phagwara, Jandiala, Jalandhar, Phillaur are the nearby cities to Maio Patti.
