= Bhagat Jawala Dass Ji =

Bhagat Jawala Dass Ji is a local Saint revered by the people of Lakhpur and the surrounding villages.

== History ==
According to local tradition, Bhagat Jawala Dass Ji was born in Lakhpur, a village in Kapurthala. He was a devoutly religious man and lived an austere life. He would hold an annual gathering of religious figures which would last throughout the night. Presently, a religious gathering takes place annually to mark the tradition started by Bhagat Ji. His main shrine is in Lakhpur which is currently being reconstructed.
