= Narangpur =

- Village
- Location in Punjab, India Narangpur (India)
- Coordinates: 31.237986°N 75.713162°E
- Country: India
- State: Punjab
- District: Kapurthala

Government
  - Type: Panchayati raj (India)
  - Body: Gram panchayat

Population (2011)
  - Total: 450
- Sex ratio 226/224♂/♀

Languages
  - Official: Punjabi
  - Other spoken: Hindi
- Time zone: UTC+5:30 (IST)
- PIN: 144401
- Telephone code: 01822
- ISO 3166 code: IN-PB
- Vehicle registration: PB-09
- Website: kapurthala.gov.in

Narangpur is a village in Phagwara tehsil in the Kapurthala district of Punjab State, India. It is 45 kilometres (28 mi) from Kapurthala and 5 kilometres (3.1 mi) from Phagwara. It is administrated by a Sarpanch, an elected representative of village.

== Transport ==
The nearest railway stations to Narangpur are Phagwara Junction and Mauli Halt. Jalandhar City railway station is 23 km away. The village is 118 km from Sri Guru Ram Dass Jee International Airport in Amritsar; and Sahnewal Airport in Ludhiana is 40 km away. Its nearest cities are Phagwara, Jandiala, Jalandhar and Phillaur.
