= Bir Dhandoli =

- Village
- Location in Punjab, India Bir Dhandoli (India)
- Coordinates: 31.283862°N 75.804910°E
- Country: India
- State: Punjab
- District: Kapurthala

Government
  - Type: Panchayati raj (India)
  - Body: Gram panchayat

Population (2011)
  - Total: 264
- Sex ratio 132/132♂/♀

Languages
  - Official: Punjabi
  - Other spoken: Hindi
- Time zone: UTC+5:30 (IST)
- PIN: 144407
- Telephone code: 01824
- ISO 3166 code: IN-PB
- Vehicle registration: PB-09
- Website: kapurthala.gov.in

Bir Dhandoli is a village in Phagwara Tehsil in Kapurthala district of Punjab State, India. It is located 50 kilometres (31 mi) from Kapurthala, 14 kilometres (8.7 mi) from Phagwara. The village is administrated by a Sarpanch who is an elected representative of village as per the constitution of India and Panchayati raj.

== Transport ==
Phagwara Junction Railway Station, Mauli Halt Railway Station are nearby railway stations to Bir Dhandoli. Jalandhar City Railway Station is 23 km away from the village. The village is 118 km away from Sri Guru Ram Dass Jee International Airport in Amritsar. Another nearby airport is Sahnewal Airport in Ludhiana which is located 40 km away from the village. Phagwara, Jandiala, Jalandhar, Phillaur are nearby cities to Bir Dhandoli village.
