= Khatti =

- village
- Location in Punjab, India Khatti (India)
- Coordinates: 31°15′53″N 75°46′49.62″E
- Country: India
- State: Punjab
- District: Kapurthala

Population (2001)
  - Total: 917

Languages
  - Official: Punjabi
- Time zone: UTC+5:30 (IST)
- Postal code: 144401
- Vehicle registration: PB-36
- Coastline: 0 kilometres (0 mi)

Khatti is a village near Khurampur, Tehsil Phagwara, Kapurthala district, in Punjab, India.

== Demographics ==
According to the 2001 Census, Khatti had a population of 917 people. Neighbouring villages include Sr Hargobindgarh, Dhadday, Chak Prema, Gulabgarh, Wariah, Khurampur and Palahi. The nearest police station is at Rawal Pindi.

== Mandir of Lord Parashurama ==
Khatti is famous for the Mandir of Lord Parashurama and as such there is a movement to declare Khatti a heritage village.

The Jayanti of Lord Parashurama is celebrated at the Mandir every year and is a big attraction.
