= Fatehgarh Sikri =

- Village
- Location in Punjab, India Fatehgarh Sikri (India)
- Coordinates: 31.610225°N 75.501464°E
- Country: India
- State: Punjab
- District: Kapurthala

Government
  - Type: Panchayati raj (India)
  - Body: Gram panchayat

Population (2011)
  - Total: 1,206

Languages
  - Official: Punjabi
  - Other spoken: Hindi
- Time zone: UTC+5:30 (IST)
- PIN: 144636
- Telephone code: 01822
- ISO 3166 code: IN-PB
- Vehicle registration: PB-09
- Website: kapurthala.gov.in

Fatehgarh Sikri is a village in Bhulath Tehsil in Kapurthala district of Punjab State, India. It is located 9 kilometres (5.6 mi) from Bhulath and 30 kilometres (19 mi) away from the district headquarters known as Kapurthala. The village is administrated by a Sarpanch, an elected representative of village as per the constitution of India and Panchayati raj (India).

== List of cities near the village ==
- Bhulath
- Kapurthala
- Phagwara
- Sultanpur Lodhi

== Air travel connectivity ==
The closest International airport to the village is Sri Guru Ram Dass Jee International Airport.
