= Nasirabad, Phagwara =

Nasirabad
- Village
- Location in Punjab, India Nasirabad (India)
- Coordinates: 31.309863°N 75.854122°E
- Country: India
- State: Punjab
- District: Kapurthala

Government
  - Type: Panchayati raj (India)
  - Body: Gram panchayat

Population (2011)
  - Total: 1,212
- Sex ratio 620/592♂/♀

Languages
  - Official: Punjabi
  - Other spoken: Hindi
- Time zone: UTC+5:30 (IST)
- PIN: 144408
- Telephone code: 01822
- ISO 3166 code: IN-PB
- Vehicle registration: PB-09
- Website: kapurthala.gov.in

Nasirabad is a village in Phagwara Tehsil in Kapurthala district of Punjab State, India. It is located 50 kilometres (31 mi) from Kapurthala, 15 kilometres (9.3 mi) from Phagwara. The village is administrated by a Sarpanch who is an elected representative of village as per the constitution of India and Panchayati raj (India).

== Transport ==
There are no railway stations less than 10 kilometres (6.2 mi) away from Nasirabad, but Jalandhar City Railway station is 27 km away from the village. The village is 121 kilometres (75 mi) from Sri Guru Ram Dass Jee International Airport in Amritsar and the other nearest airport is Sahnewal Airport in Ludhiana which is located 49 kilometres (30 mi) from the village. Phagwara, Jandiala, Jalandhar, and Hoshiarpur are nearby cities.
