= Bhakhriana =

Bhakhriana ਭਾਖੜੀਆਣਾ
- Village
- Location in Punjab, India Bhakhriana ਭਾਖੜੀਆਣਾ (India)
- Coordinates: 31°18′34.49″N 75°41′40.31″E
- Country: India
- State: Punjab
- District: Kapurthala
- Tehsil: Phagwara

Government
  - Type: Panchayat raj
  - Body: Gram panchayat

Area
  - Total: 547.56 ha (1,353.1 acres)

Population (2011)
  - Total: 1,512; 783/729 ♂/♀
  - Scheduled Castes: 675; 349/326 ♂/♀
  - Total Households: 340

Languages
  - Official: Punjabi
- Time zone: UTC+5:30 (IST)
- ISO 3166 code: IN-PB
- Website: kapurthala.gov.in

Bhakhriana is a village in Phagwara in Kapurthala district of Punjab State, India. It is located 13 kilometres (8.1 mi) from sub district headquarter and 44 kilometres (27 mi) from district headquarter. The village is administrated by Sarpanch an elected representative of the village. This is the hometown of Punjabi singer Jass Manak Bhakhriana. Some villagers participated in the First and Second World Wars with Lieutenant Harcharan Singh awarded military decoration. First Junior Commissioned Officer of this village, was commissioned in first Gazette of India on 15th Aug, 1947 by President of India. In Oct 1947, first war in Teetwal J&K 1 with Pakistan Sikh Regt Sepoy Gurbachan Singh awarded VIR CHAKKARA gallantry award after death, was of this village. Village has been part of Phagwara taluka PEPSU state since 1966. Now it falls in Phagwara Taluka and Kapurthala District of East Punjab. A primary school was established before 1952 and upgraded to a middle school by 2008. In 1993, Punjab PWD (B&R) minister Mr. Joginder Singh Maan executed a bridge at Weinhi (ਵੇਈ) and connected to Taluka Phagwara.

== Demography ==
As of 2011, the village has a total number of 340 houses and a population of 1512 of which 783 are males while 729 are females. According to the report published by Census India in 2011, out of the total population of the village 675 people are from Schedule Caste and the village does not have any Schedule Tribe population so far.

== See also ==
- List of villages in India
