= Athouli =

- village
- Country: India
- State: Punjab
  - Rank: 1524

Languages
  - Official: Punjabi
- Time zone: UTC+5:30 (IST)
- Vehicle registration: PB-36

Athouli is a village located in the sub-district of Phagwara, District Kapurthala, East Punjab, India.

Athouli contains 246 households and has a population of 1,331 people of which 703 are males and 703 are females.

Athouli is home to the Guru Nanak Institute of Health Sciences and Research ("GNI") which is a nursing institute providing nursing education to students in Punjab. GNI is partnered with Bellingham Technical College based in Bellingham, Washington, USA, for the provision of healthcare education.
