= Hardaspur =

Place in Punjab, India

Coordinates: 32°38′32″N 74°09′13″E

Hardaspur ہرداسپور
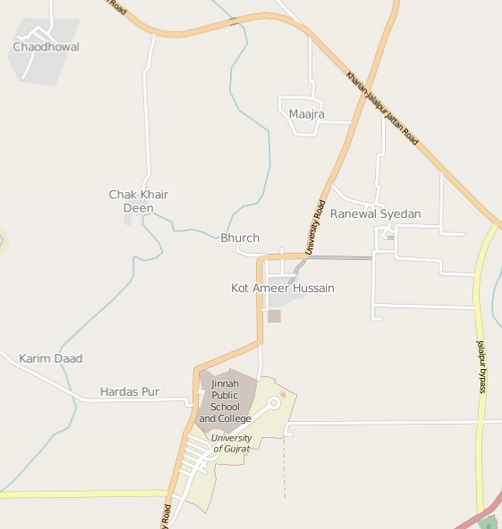
- Location of Hardaspur on map
- Country: Pakistan
- Province: Punjab
- District: Gujrat
- Time zone: UTC+5 (PST)
- Calling code: 053

Hardaspur (Urdu: ہرداس پور) is a village in Gujrat District, Pakistan.
