= Randhirgarh =

- Village
- Country: India
- State: Punjab
- District: Kapurthala
- Tehsil: Phagwara

Government
  - Type: Panchayat raj
  - Body: Gram panchayat

Area
  - Total: 107 ha (260 acres)

Population (2011)
  - Total: 473; 245/228 ♂/♀
  - Scheduled Castes: 150; 86/64 ♂/♀
  - Total Households: 108

Languages
  - Official: Punjabi
- Time zone: UTC+5:30 (IST)
- ISO 3166 code: IN-PB
- Website: kapurthala.gov.in

Randhirgarh is a village in Phagwara in Kapurthala district of Punjab State, India. It is located 15 kilometres (9.3 mi) from sub district headquarter and 55 kilometres (34 mi) from district headquarter. The village is administrated by Sarpanch an elected representative of the village.

== Demography ==
As of 2011, The village has a total number of 108 houses and the population of 473 of which 245 are males while 228 are females. According to the report published by Census India in 2011, out of the total population of the village 150 people are from Schedule Caste and the village does not have any Schedule Tribe population so far.

== See also ==
- List of villages in India
