= Dhandoli =

- Village
- Location in Punjab, India Dhandoli (India)
- Coordinates: 31.281424°N 75.792559°E
- Country: India
- State: Punjab
- District: Kapurthala

Government
  - Type: Panchayati raj (India)
  - Body: Gram panchayat

Population (2011)
  - Total: 208
- Sex ratio 107/101♂/♀

Languages
  - Official: Punjabi
  - Other spoken: Hindi
- Time zone: UTC+5:30 (IST)
- PIN: 144407
- Telephone code: 01822
- ISO 3166 code: IN-PB
- Vehicle registration: PB-09
- Website: kapurthala.gov.in

Dhandoli is a village in Phagwara Tehsil in Kapurthala district of Punjab State, India. It is located 45 kilometres (28 mi) from Kapurthala, 16 kilometres (9.9 mi) from Phagwara. 129 kilometres (80 mi) from State capital Chandigarh. The village is administrated by a Sarpanch, who is an elected representative.

== Demography ==
According to the report published by Census India in 2011, Dhandoli has 43 houses with the total population of 208 persons of which 107 are male and 101 females. Literacy rate of Dhandoli is 72.93%, lower than the state average of 75.84%. The population of children in the age group 0–6 years is 27 which is 12.98% of the total population. Child sex ratio is approximately 350, lower than the state average of 846.

== Population data ==
Particulars	Total	Male	Female
Total No. of Houses	43	-	-
Population	208	107	101
Child (0-6)	27	20	7
Schedule Caste	177	91	86
Schedule Tribe	0	0	0
Literacy	72.93 %	79.31 %	67.02 %
Total Workers	71	68	3
Main Worker	70	0	0
Marginal Worker	1	1	0

== Transport ==
Phagwara Junction and Mauli Halt are the closest railway stations to Chachoki; Jalandhar City railway station is 23 km away from the village. The village is 114 km away from Sri Guru Ram Dass Jee International Airport in Amritsar and the closest airport is Sahnewal Airport in Ludhiana which is located 43 km distant.
