= Sikri, Phagwara =

Sikri
- Village
- Location in Punjab, India Sikri (India)
- Coordinates: 31.301059°N 75.775666°E
- Country: India
- State: Punjab
- District: Kapurthala

Government
  - Type: Panchayati raj (India)
  - Body: Gram panchayat

Population (2011)
  - Total: 548
- Sex ratio 254/294♂/♀

Languages
  - Official: Punjabi
  - Other spoken: Hindi
- Time zone: UTC+5:30 (IST)
- PIN: 144401
- Telephone code: 01822
- ISO 3166 code: IN-PB
- Vehicle registration: PB-36
- Website: kapurthala.gov.in

Sikri is a village in Phagwara Tehsil in Kapurthala district of Punjab State, India. It is located 45 kilometres (28 mi) from Kapurthala, 9 kilometres (5.6 mi) from Phagwara. Most of the families belongs to Sikh Rajput community. The village is administrated by a Sarpanch Mrs. Gurdeep Kaur is an elected representative of village. Other Members of panchayat are Kewal Singh, Rajinder Singh, Balvir Singh, Manjit Kaur, Resham Kaur.

== Transport ==
Nearby railway stations to Sikri include Phagwara Junction Railway Station and Mauli Halt Railway Station. Jalandhar City Railway station is 23 km away from the village. The village is 118 km away from Sri Guru Ram Dass Jee International Airport in Amritsar. The other nearest airport is Sahnewal Airport in Ludhiana which is located 40 km away from the village.
