= Rawalpindi, Kapurthala =

Rawalpindi
- village
- Location in Punjab, India Rawalpindi (India)
- Coordinates: 31°17′26.31″N 75°47′31.25″E
- Country: India
- State: Punjab
- District: Kapurthala

Population (2001)
  - Total: 1,087

Languages
  - Official: Punjabi
- Time zone: UTC+5:30 (IST)
- Vehicle registration: PB-
- Coastline: 0 kilometres (0 mi)

Rawalpindi is a village in Tehsil Phagwara, Kapurthala district, in Punjab, India.

== Demographics ==
According to the 2001 Census, Rawalpindi has a population of 1,087 people. Neighbouring villages include Sahni (Lakhpur-Sahni), Bir Dhadoli, Dhadoli, Sri Hargobindgarh, Ramgarh and Sikri.

Rawalpindi is on the Phagwara to Hoshiarpur Road. It has a Gurdwara, a parade of shops on the main road and is famous for its police station.

== History ==
Rawalpindi was a Muslim village made up of the Rawal community prior to the 1947 Partition when the Muslim families left for Pakistan. The village is now inhabited by Hindus and Sikhs who left west Punjab.

== Police station ==
Rawalpindi police Station, presently a unit of the Sadar Police Phagwara, was adjudged the best rural police station of the country in 2007. It has also been awarded the fifth position in Asia in a competition among the police stations of the Asia Pacific in 2008. Subsequently, Rawalpindi police station and Sultanpur Lodhi police station secured the first place in another competition in 2009.

Rawalpindi Police Station is the first rural police station in India to provide a video conference system for people residing abroad and the surrounding villages. Non Resident Indians can talk directly to the police authorities including DSP Phagwara and SHO Rawalpindi.

The police station has seven CCTV cameras to monitor the working of police employees. Complaint Cards have been prepared which would be provided to the complainant showing the date of the report, the name of the enquiry officer and the status of the complaint.

The Rawalpindi police station also adheres to its Citizens Charter.
