= Kotli Than Singh =

- Village
- Location in Punjab, India Kotli Than Singh (India)
- Coordinates: 31.32°N 75.68°E
- Country: India
- State: Punjab
- District: Jalandhar

Population (2011)
  - Total: 2,701
- Time zone: UTC+5:30 (IST)
- PIN: 144101
- literacy rate: 73.64%
- Sex ratio: 1.06

Kotli Than Singh is a village located in the Jalandhar district of Punjab, India.

== Demographics ==
According to the 2011 Census, Kotli Than Singh had a population of 2,701. Males constituted 51.43% of the population and females 48.57%. The village had a literacy rate of 73.64%: male and female literacy rate was 77.61% and 69.44% respectively. In the village, 10.3% of the population was under 6 years of age. With 57.1% share in population, the Scheduled Castes (SCs) were the biggest community in the village. There are 4 Gurudawara and 1 Temple situated in the village.
