= Rehana Jattan =

- Village
- Country: India
- State: Punjab
- District: Kapurthala
- Tehsil: Phagwara

Government
  - Type: Panchayat raj
  - Body: Gram panchayat

Area
  - Total: 609 ha (1,500 acres)

Population (2011)
  - Total: 2,621; 1,386/1,235 ♂/♀
  - Scheduled Castes: 1,102; 586/516 ♂/♀
  - Total Households: 554

Languages
  - Official: Punjabi
- Time zone: UTC+5:30 (IST)
- ISO 3166 code: IN-PB
- Website: kapurthala.gov.in

Rehana Jattan is a village in Phagwara in Kapurthala district of Punjab State, India. It is located 15 kilometres (9.3 mi) from sub district headquarter and 58 kilometres (36 mi) from district headquarter. The village is administrated by Sarpanch an elected representative of the village.

== Demography ==
As of 2011, The village has a total number of 554 houses and the population of 2621 of which 1386 are males while 1235 are females. According to the report published by Census India in 2011, out of the total population of the village 1102 people are from Schedule Caste and the village does not have any Schedule Tribe population so far.

== See also ==
- List of villages in India
