= Hadiabad (Phagwara) =

- sub-town
- Location in Punjab, India Hadiabad (India)
- Coordinates: 31°13′12″N 75°44′38″E
- Country: India
- State: Punjab
- District: Kapurthala
- Elevation: 234 m (768 ft)

Population (2001)
  - Total: 2,000

Languages
  - Official: Punjabi
- Time zone: UTC+5:30 (IST)
- Telephone code: 01824
- Vehicle registration: PB 36

Hadiabad is a historic sub-town in the city of Phagwara in Punjab (India), about 2 kilometres (1.2 mi) west of Phagwara sub-town. It is the biggest area in size on the western part of the city. Many Sikh followers worship at the gurdwara Chhevin Patshahl.

== History ==
Hadiabad is treated as a sacred place because Guru Hargobind, the sixth Sikh guru, visited there in 1635. The gurdwara and historical shrine Chhevin Patshahi is located in Hadiabad, as a three-storey pavilion with an octagonal dome. In the main hall, the Holy Guru Granth Sahib is displayed. All major Sikh festivals are celebrated there, along with daily worship by many devotees who travel to Hadiabad to offer their services. Mansa Devi Mandir and the Vishwakarma Temple are nearby. The Pathshala predates the Gurudwara, indeed the gurudwara stands on land donated by the pathshala.

== Notable people ==
Notable for being the hometown of Ram Kumar Chadha, the contribution to the wider community has made him a pillar of society.

== Transport ==
Hadiabad is connected to Phagwara by Hadiabad main road, which starts off from the city centre, past the Adarsh Nagar Flyover and on to Hadiabad main road. Phagwara Junction Railway Station is the closest railhead. Ludhiana, 38 kilometres (24 mi) to the south, has the nearest airport.
