= Sangatpur =

- Village
- Location in Punjab, India Sangatpur (India)
- Coordinates: 31°16′12.87″N 75°49′43.82″E
- Country: India
- State: Punjab
- District: Kapurthala

Government
  - Type: Panchayati Raj (India)
  - Body: Gram panchayat

Area
  - Total: 4.18 km^{2} (1.61 sq mi)
- Elevation: 250 m (820 ft)

Population (2001)
  - Total: 2,260
  - Rank: 27^{th}
  - Density: 541/km^{2} (1,400/sq mi)

Languages
  - Official: Punjabi
- Time zone: UTC+5:30 (IST)
- Postal code: 144401
- Vehicle registration: PB-36
- Head of the Village: Sarpanch Tajinder Nagra(Rinki Lambardar)

Sangatpur is a village in Punjab, Tehsil Phagwara, Kapurthala district, in India. The name of the village means unity amongst the people. The village of Begampur is administratively part of Sangatpur and is a relatively new settlement. Neighbouring villages include Lakhpur, Mahliana, Malikhpur, Chak Prema, Ghummana, Pandori and Akalgarh.

== Demographics ==
According to the 2001 Census, Sangatpur has 2,260 people.

== About the village ==
The village has 5 prominent Gurdwaras, Gurudwara Qilla Sahib, Gurudwara Baba Nihal Singh, Gurudwara Kutia Sahib, Gurudwara Singh Shaheedan, Gurudwara Baba Vir Singh, shops, a Primary School, a Shiv Mandir, and Ma Kaali Temple. Sangatpur is famous for the annual Baba Shah Fateh Ali Mela which attracts a large attendance.
