= Mahliana =

- Village
- Location in Punjab, India Mahliana (India)
- Coordinates: 31.2738009°N 75.8490515°E
- Country: India
- State: Punjab
- District: Shaheed Bhagat Singh Nagar

Government
  - Type: Panchayat raj
  - Body: Gram panchayat
- Elevation: 251 m (823 ft)

Population (2011)
  - Total: 1,299
- Sex ratio 672/627 ♂/♀

Languages
  - Official: Punjabi
- Time zone: UTC+5:30 (IST)
- PIN: 144503
- Telephone code: 01884
- ISO 3166 code: IN-PB
- Post office: Pharala
- Website: nawanshahr.nic.in

Mahliana is a village in Shaheed Bhagat Singh Nagar district of Punjab State, India. It is located 7.8 kilometres (4.8 mi) away from post office Mahil Gailan, 33 kilometres (21 mi) from Nawanshahr, 31 kilometres (19 mi) from district headquarter Shaheed Bhagat Singh Nagar and 123 kilometres (76 mi) from state capital Chandigarh. The village is administrated by Sarpanch an elected representative of the village.

== Demography ==
As of 2011, Mahliana has a total number of 268 houses and population of 1299 of which 672 include are males while 627 are females according to the report published by Census India in 2011. The literacy rate of Mahliana is 79.44%, higher than the state average of 75.84%. The population of children under the age of 6 years is 112 which is 8.62% of total population of Mahliana, and child sex ratio is approximately 750 as compared to Punjab state average of 846.

Most of the people are from Schedule Caste which constitutes 67.13% of the total population in Mahliana. The town does not have any Schedule Tribe population so far.

As per the report published by Census India in 2011, 482 people were engaged in work activities out of the total population of Mahliana which includes 397 males and 85 females. According to census survey report 2011, 85.06% workers describe their work as main work and 14.94% workers are involved in Marginal activity providing livelihood for less than 6 months.

== Education ==
The village has a Punjabi medium, co-ed primary school The school provide mid-day meal as per Indian Midday Meal Scheme. As per Right of Children to Free and Compulsory Education Act the school provide free education to children between the ages of 6 and 14.

Amardeep Singh Shergill Memorial college Mukandpur and Sikh National College Banga are the nearest colleges. Industrial Training Institute for women (ITI Nawanshahr) is 34 kilometres (21 mi) The village is 81 kilometres (50 mi) from Indian Institute of Technology and 18 kilometres (11 mi) away from Lovely Professional University.

== Transport ==
Banga railway station is the nearest train station however, Phagwara Junction train station is 12 kilometres (7.5 mi) away from the village. Sahnewal Airport is the nearest domestic airport located 63 kilometres (39 mi) away in Ludhiana and the nearest international airport is located in Chandigarh also Sri Guru Ram Dass Jee International Airport is the second nearest airport which is 126 kilometres (78 mi) away in Amritsar.

== See also ==
- List of villages in India
