= Dhadoli =

Dhadoli Dhandoli
- Village
- Location in Punjab, India Dhadoli (India)
- Coordinates: 31.2815°N 75.7931°E
- Country: India
- State: Punjab
- District: Kapurthala

Population (2001)
  - Total: 221

Languages
  - Official: Punjabi
- Time zone: UTC+5:30 (IST)
- Vehicle registration: PB-
- Coastline: 0 kilometres (0 mi)

Dhadoli is a village near Lakhpur, Tehsil Phagwara, Kapurthala district, in Punjab, India.

== Demographics ==
According to the 2001 Census, Dhadoli has a population of 221 people. Neighbouring villages include Bir Dhadoli, Lakhpur, Dhadday Chak Prema, and Rawal Pindi.
