= Bohani =

Bohani Kohani (historical)
- Village
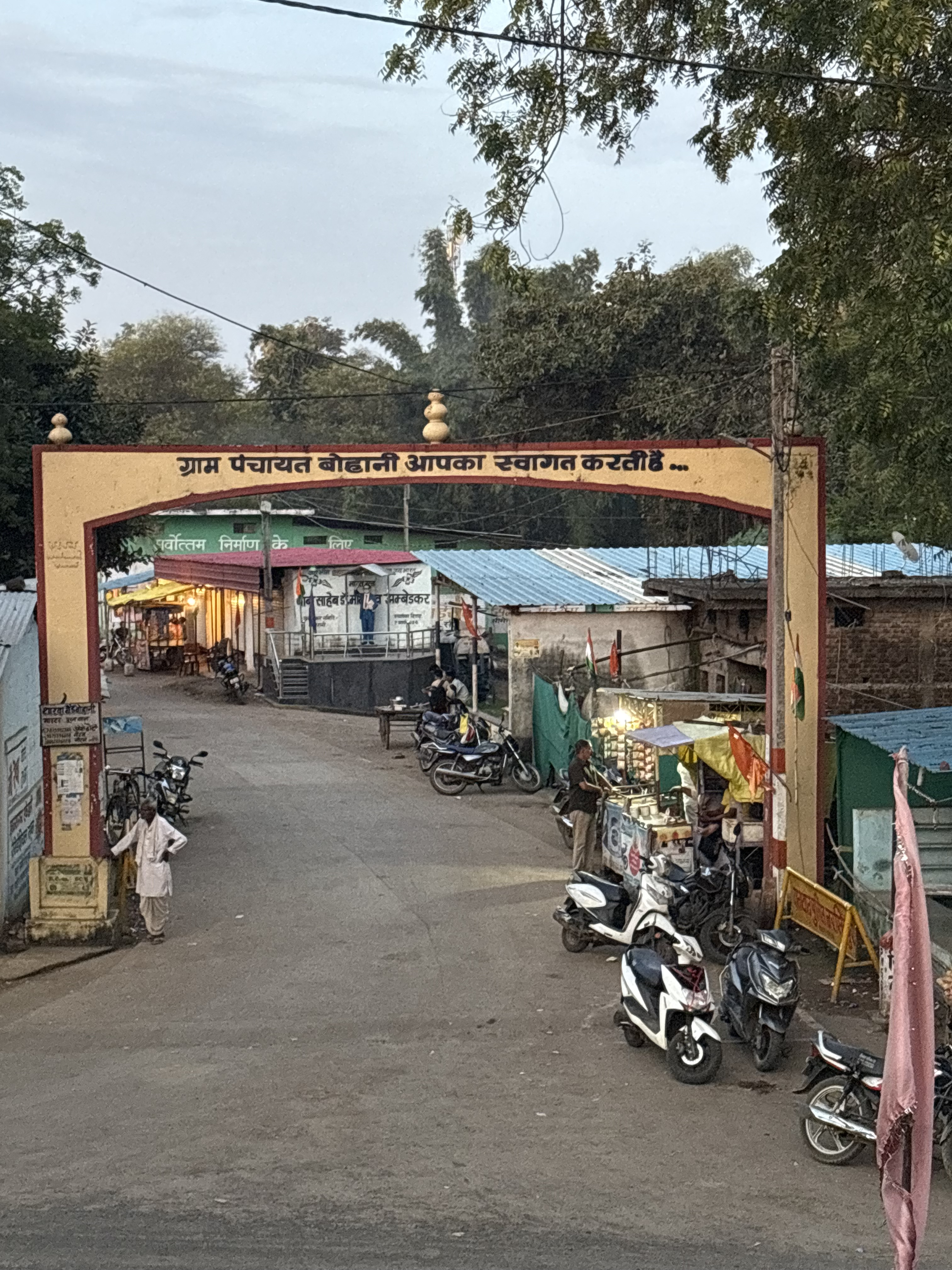

- Location in Madhya Pradesh, India
- Coordinates: 22.932498°N 78.854907°E
- Country: India
- State: Madhya Pradesh
- Division: Jabalpur
- District: Narsinghpur
- Tehsil: Gadarwara
- Gram panchayat: Bohani

Government
  - Type: Panchayati raj
  - Sarpanch: Kiran Sharma (Behan Ji)

Area
  - Total: 13.77 km^{2} (5.32 sq mi)

Population (2011)
  - Total: 3,982
- Demonym: Bohaniwasi

Languages
  - Official: Hindi
- Time zone: UTC+5:30 (IST)
- PIN: 487555
- Telephone code: 07791-244xxx
- Vehicle registration: MP 49

Chaudhary Raghav Singh Mishra, who donated 256 acres for an agricultural school in 1954

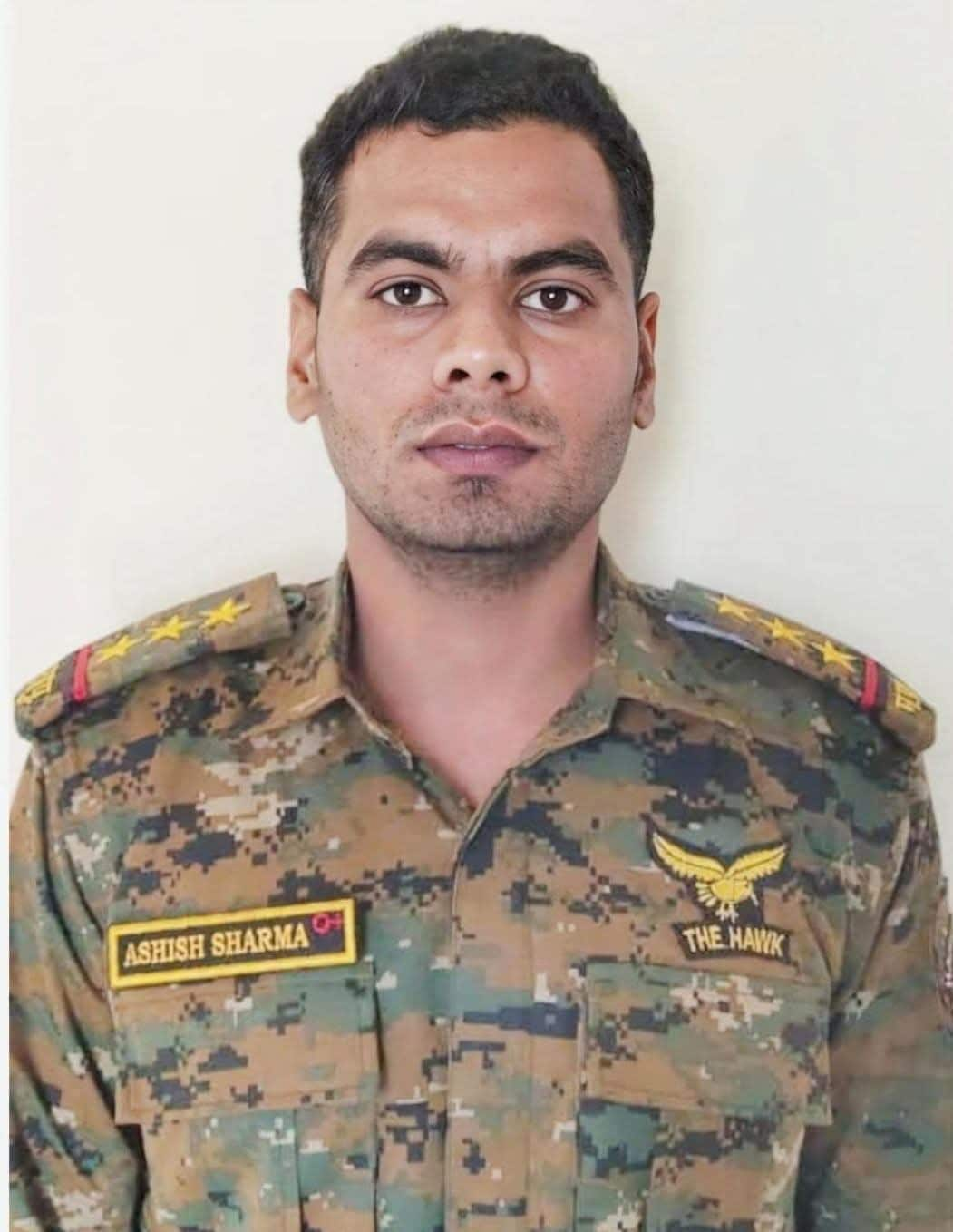
Ashish Sharma, inspector in the Madhya Pradesh Police Hawk Force, known for counter-Maoist operations and killed in action in 2025.

Bohani (formerly Kohani) is a village in the Gadarwara tehsil of Narsinghpur district in the Jabalpur division of the Indian state of Madhya Pradesh. It lies about 6 miles (9.7 km) east of Gadarwara on the old Bombay to Mirzapur road and has a railway station on the Itarsi to Jabalpur main line. The village is known locally for the temple of the goddess Mirhwani Devi and for the fair held in her honour in the month of Chaitra.

== History ==
=== Early traditions ===
The 1906 Narsinghpur District Gazetteer, compiled by R. V. Russell, describes Bohani as an old village whose earlier name was Kohani. It records a local tradition that Jasraj, the father of the Banaphar Rajput generals Alha and Udal, was killed here, and notes that old cowries had been dug up at the site. The gazetteer also mentions a stone with an inscription, sunk in the ground near a date palm, which villagers believed pointed to treasure buried by a Banjara within a bowshot of the tree. No scholarly reading of this inscription has been published.

The 1971 Madhya Pradesh District Gazetteer repeats these traditions and adds that the tank at Bohani was built in the 12th century, and that its northern embankment forms part of a ruined stone palace said to have belonged to Jasraj and his brother Bachhraj. The gazetteer does not cite a source for these claims.

=== Colonial period ===
According to the 1906 gazetteer, Bohani in 1901 had a population of 1,300, an area of more than 3,000 acres and a primary school. The village was then owned by Ragho Singh alias Chhadami Lal, a Golapurab Brahmin. In the land revenue settlement of 1891 to 1893, the Bohani assessment group had the highest revenue rate in Gadarwara tahsil. The railway reached the district in 1870, and by 1905 Bohani was one of the eight railway stations in Narsinghpur district.

During the Quit India Movement of 1942, students damaged Bohani railway station, and the colonial government imposed a collective fine of 500 rupees on the village.

=== After independence ===
The Gandhi Sewa Samiti, Bohani, was organised in 1951 to promote social welfare, khadi and cottage industries. In the 1960s the village had higher secondary schooling, a charkha training centre, a maternity and child welfare centre, an Ayurvedic dispensary, a veterinary dispensary, a branch post office and a co-operative credit society, and it had been electrified. Bohani was also the name of a state assembly constituency at the 1967 election.

== Philanthropy ==
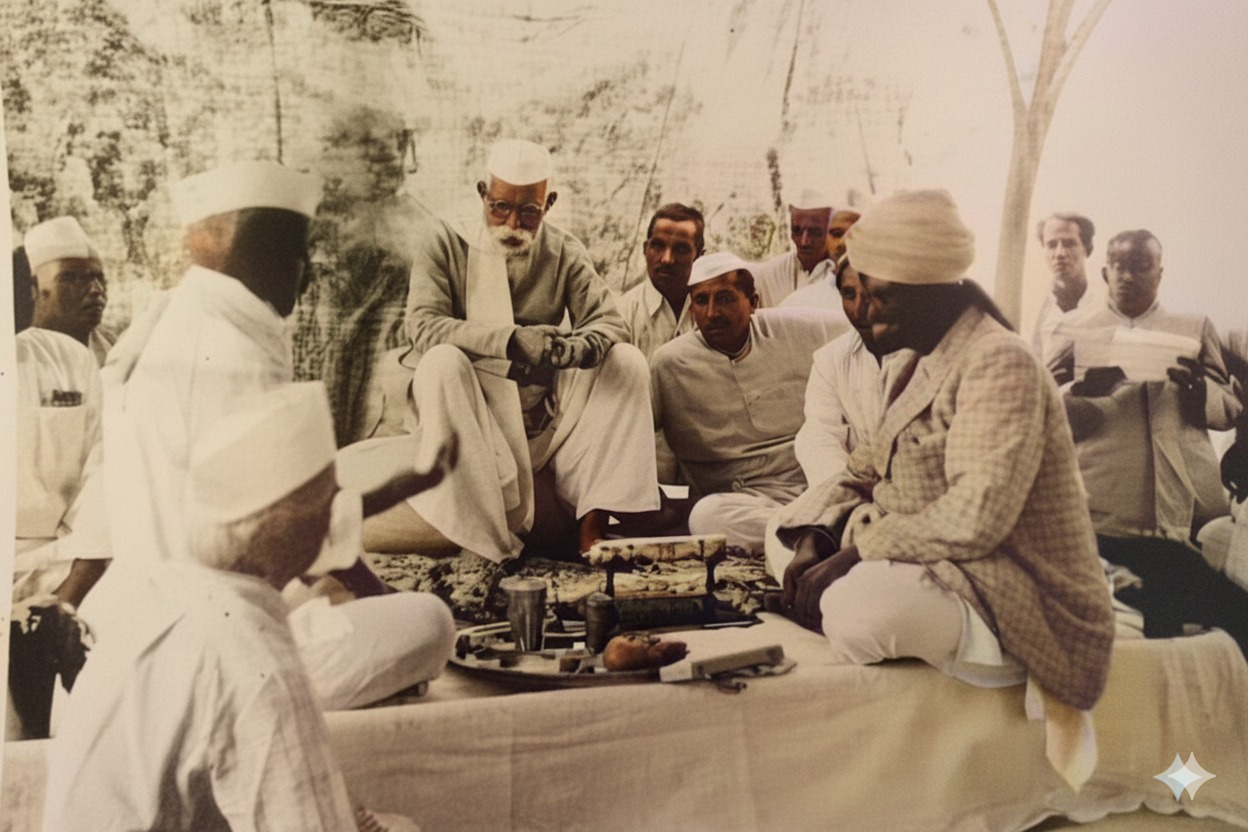
Chief Minister Ravishankar Shukla accepting the land donation from Raghav Singh Mishra at Bohani in 1954

In 1954 Chaudhary Raghav Singh Mishra, a former malguzar of Bohani, donated 256 acres of farmland, together with 16 pairs of bakhar and other farm implements, so that an agricultural school could be set up in the village. Chief Minister Ravishankar Shukla came to Bohani in person to accept the donation. According to the Patrika report, the donation was inspired by the Narsinghpur freedom fighter Chaudhary Shankarlal Dubey.

The Government Raghav Higher Secondary School, opened in 1954, was named after the ex-malguzar who had donated the property. It became an agricultural higher secondary school in 1961 and in 1961 to 1962 had 204 students and 16 teachers, with its own farm and seed plots. Today it is the Government Raghav Krishi Higher Secondary School (transl. Government Raghav Agriculture Higher Secondary School).

Raghav Singh Mishra's wife, Rani Girnari Dulari Bai, is remembered in the village through the government hospital, which for many years was known as the Rani Girnari Dulari Bai Government Hospital, Bohani. Her name appeared on the hospital's signboard and at the top of the doctors' prescription slips, but the painted name on the board has since faded.

== Economy ==
The economy of Bohani depends on agriculture, mainly sugarcane; the 1971 gazetteer describes Bohani as the western end of the district's sugarcane belt. Other notable products include vegetables, fruits, oil-seed, flowers and dairy products.

== Culture ==
The people of Bohani worship Mirhwani Devi, a local goddess named after a village that had disappeared by the early 20th century. She was traditionally believed to cure blindness and leprosy. In the early 1900s her fair in the month of Chait drew about 5,000 people; by the 1960s it was a three day fair held in Chaitra.

== Education ==
Bohani has seven schools:

- Government Primary School (GPS): the only primary school, serving grades 1 through 5. It is managed by the Department of Education of Madhya Pradesh.
- Government Middle School (GMS): a co-educational school recognised by Madhya Pradesh, serving grades 6 through 8.
- Government Raghav Krishi Higher Secondary School, founded in 1954 on land donated by Raghav Singh Mishra.
- Swami Vivekananda Public School.
- Jawahar Navodaya Vidyalaya Bohani, Narsinghpur (M.P.), which the central government manages.
- Trinity Memorial International School.

== Health services ==
There are three main health services in Bohani:

- Government hospital (Primary Health Centre), Bohani, formerly known as the Rani Girnari Dulari Bai Government Hospital
- Government Veterinary Hospital; a veterinary dispensary existed in the village by the 1960s
- Private clinic

== Water ==
Bohani is connected to piped water supply, but wells, including tube wells, remain commonly used for agricultural irrigation in the area.

== Communication and Internet ==
- Bharat Sanchar Nigam Limited provides landline and broadband services.
- 2G, 4G and 5G mobile services are available.
- FTTH internet by Gram Panchayat National Broadband Network, BBNL
- Fibre based internet by Bharat Sanchar Nigam Limited
- AirFiber based on 5G by Reliance Jio

== Demographics ==
At the 2011 census of India, Bohani (village code 490758) had a population of 3,982 (2,133 males and 1,849 females) in 812 households, over an area of 1,377.49 hectares. The literacy rate was 85.25 per cent. The state Panchayat Darpan portal lists 839 families and a population of 3,601 for the village.

Historical population
Year	Population	Source
1901	1,300	1906 district gazetteer
1961	1,590	1971 district gazetteer
2011	3,982	Census of India

== Notable people ==
- Ashish Sharma (Police officer), inspector in the Madhya Pradesh Police Hawk Force, known for counter-Maoist operations and killed in action in 2025.
- Chaudhary Raghav Singh Mishra, former malguzar of Bohani, who donated 256 acres of land for the village's agricultural school in 1954.

== Transport ==
Railway Stations
Name	Station Code	Distance
Baranjh	BNJH	3.3 km
Bohani	BNE	7.7 km
Gadarwara	GAR	12.2 km
