= Dhak Malikpur =

- Village
- Location in Punjab, India Dhak Malikpur (India)
- Coordinates: 31.266804°N 75.866830°E
- Country: India
- State: Punjab
- District: Kapurthala

Government
  - Type: Panchayati raj (India)
  - Body: Gram panchayat

Population (2011)
  - Total: 531
- Sex ratio 291/240♂/♀

Languages
  - Official: Punjabi
  - Other spoken: Hindi
- Time zone: UTC+5:30 (IST)
- PIN: 144408
- Telephone code: 01822
- ISO 3166 code: IN-PB
- Vehicle registration: PB-09
- Website: kapurthala.gov.in

Dhak Malikpur is a village in Phagwara Tehsil in the Kapurthala district of Punjab State, India. It is located 53 kilometres (33 mi) from Kapurthala, 13 kilometres (8.1 mi) from Phagwara. The village is administrated by a Sarpanch, who is an elected representative.

== Demography ==
According to the report published by Census India in 2011, Dhak Malikpur has 110 houses with a total population of 531 persons of which 291 are male and 240 females. The literacy rate of Dhak Malikpur is 79.92%, higher than the state average of 75.84%. The population of children in the age group 0–6 years is 43 which is 8.10% of the total population. The child sex ratio is approximately 792, lower than the state average of 846.

== Population data ==
| Particulars | Total | Male | Female |
|---|---|---|---|
| Total No. of Houses | 110 | - | - |
| Population | 531 | 291 | 240 |
| Child (0-6) | 43 | 24 | 19 |
| Schedule Caste | 513 | 280 | 233 |
| Schedule Tribe | 0 | 0 | 0 |
| Literacy | 79.92 % | 83.90 % | 75.11 % |
| Total Workers | 181 | 170 | 11 |
| Main Worker | 180 | 0 | 0 |
| Marginal Worker | 1 | 0 | 1 |
