= Prempur =

- Village
- Country: India
- State: Punjab
- District: Kapurthala
- Tehsil: Phagwara

Government
  - Type: Panchayat raj
  - Body: Gram panchayat

Area
  - Total: 282.48 ha (698.0 acres)

Population (2011)
  - Total: 546; 287/259 ♂/♀
  - Scheduled Castes: 221; 123/98 ♂/♀
  - Total Households: 90

Languages
  - Official: Punjabi
- Time zone: UTC+5:30 (IST)
- 144405: 144405
- Telephone: 01824
- ISO 3166 code: IN-PB
- Vehicle registration: PB36
- Website: kapurthala.gov.in ideeprathour

Prempur is a village in Phagwara in Kapurthala district of Punjab State, India. It is located 12 kilometres (7.5 mi) from sub district headquarter and 52 kilometres (32 mi) from district headquarter. The village is administrated by an elected representative of the village.

== Demography ==
As of 2011, The village has a total number of 90 houses and the population of 546 of which 287 are males while 259 are females. According to the report published by Census India in 2011, out of the total population of the village 221 people are from Schedule Caste and the village does not have any Schedule Tribe population so far.

== See also ==
- List of villages in India
