= Bir Dhadoli =

Bir Dhadoli Bir Dhandoli
- Village
- Location in Punjab, India Bir Dhadoli (India)
- Coordinates: 31.2841°N 75.8050°E
- Country: India
- State: Punjab
- District: Kapurthala

Population (2001)
  - Total: 246

Languages
  - Official: Punjabi
- Time zone: UTC+5:30 (IST)
- Vehicle registration: PB-
- Coastline: 0 kilometres (0 mi)

Bir Dhadoli is a village near Lakhpur, Tehsil Phagwara, Kapurthala district, in Punjab, India.

== Demographics ==
According to the 2001 Census, Bir Dhadoli has a population of 246 people. Neighbouring villages include Dhadoli, Lakhpur, Dhadday, Chak Prema, and Rawal Pindi.
