= Chair, Phagwara =

Chair
- Village
- Location in Punjab, India Chair (India)
- Coordinates: 31.260355°N 75.887525°E
- Country: India
- State: Punjab
- District: Kapurthala

Government
  - Body: Gram panchayat

Population (2011)
  - Total: 753
- Sex ratio 395/358♂/♀

Languages
  - Official: Punjabi
  - Other spoken: Hindi
- Time zone: UTC+5:30 (IST)
- PIN: 144408
- Telephone code: 01822
- ISO 3166 code: IN-PB
- Vehicle registration: PB-09
- Website: kapurthala.gov.in

Chair is a village in Phagwara Tehsil in Kapurthala district of Punjab State, India. It is located 50 kilometres (31 mi) from Kapurthala, 15 kilometres (9.3 mi) from Phagwara. The village is administrated by a Sarpanch who is an elected representative of village as per the constitution of India and Panchayati raj (India).

== Transport ==
Bahram Railway Station, Kulthamabdullas Railway Station are the nearby railway stations to Chair however, Jalandhar City Rail Way station is 32 km away from the village. The village is 127 km away from Sri Guru Ram Dass Jee International Airport in Amritsar and another near airport is Sahnewal Airport in Ludhiana which is located 45 km away from the village. Phagwara, Jandiala, Nawanshahr, Phillaur are the nearby Cities to Chair village.
