= Domeli, Kapurthala =

Domeli
- village
- Location in Punjab, India Domeli (India)
- Coordinates: 31.3488953°N 75.7907349°E
- Country: India
- State: Punjab
- District: Kapurthala

Population (2001)
  - Total: 3,000

Languages
  - Official: Punjabi
- Time zone: UTC+5:30 (IST)
- PIN: 144407
- Telephone code: 01824
- Vehicle registration: PB-36
- Nearest city: Phagwara

Domeli is a village in Tehsil Phagwara, Kapurthala district, in Punjab, India.

== Demographics ==
According to the 2001 Census, Domeli has a population of 3,000 people. But now the population has increased by four times. Neighbouring villages include Gujratan, Miranpur, Rehana Jattan, Bhabhiana, Babeli, Dugga, Musapur, Jethpur, Bhakriana and Lutera Kalan.

== Gurdwara Thamm Sahib Patshahi Chhevin (6th) ==
Domeli is sacred to Guru Hargobind Sahib Ji who, according to local tradition, visited the village on 11 Chet 1695 Bk / 9 March 1638. The Gurdwara dedicated to the Guru Ji's visit is the Thamm Sahib Patshahi Chevin (6th). It is said that the Guru Ji installed a wooden column (thamm, in Punjabi) which is preserved as a sacred relic. The Gurdwara, entered through a small gateway opening on a narrow lane inside the village, is a hall with a high, vaulted ceiling.

The sanctum, a raised platform in the middle of the room, has the Thamm Sahib draped in cloth in the centre with the Guru Granth Sahib Ji seated on a palaki (palanquin). The Gurdwara is managed by the Shiromani Gurdwara Parbandhak Committee through a local committee. The major annual celebration is the birthday of Guru Hargobind.

The Gurdwara has a college next to it.

== Around Domeli ==
Domeli has a hospital and a school, Contributions to make these facilities came from many families in the village and abroad. The nearest main road is the Phagwara-Hoshiarpur Road. The other local road runs from Domeli to Rama Mandi in Jalandar and joins the Jalandhar-Adampur Road. This road passes the villages of Musapur, Ucha, Mohadipur, Bohani, Sarnana, Talhan and Dhilwan.

Domeli has a number of families with the Ganger, Jakhu, and Nijjer surname. Late Jalldar(S) Paramjit Singh and Kamaljit Singh are said to be the predominant leaders in promoting the village and helping implement infrastructure. Many people from Domeli now live in Canada, England, America, Greece and other foreign countries. Domeli is a very big village, it has a gurudwara Dara Baba Dalip Singh, and is very popular area for tourists and villagers. Many years ago, Master Sadhu Ram Ganger of Domeli, was a member of Parliament. Sardar Mann Singh Nijjar was the Block Development & Panchyat Officer. Almost every family in Domeli has a relative or family member abroad.
