= Sahni, Punjab =

Sahni Lakhpur-Sahni
- village
- Location in Punjab, India Sahni (India)
- Coordinates: 31°20′00″N 75°52′00″E
- Country: India
- State: Punjab
- District: Kapurthala

Government
  - Type: Panchayati raj (India)
  - Body: Gram panchayat

Population (2001)
  - Total: 1,264

Languages
  - Official: Punjabi
- Time zone: UTC+5:30 (IST)
- PIN: 144405
- Telephone code: 01824
- Vehicle registration: PB-
- Coastline: 0 kilometres (0 mi)

Sahni is a village near Lakhpur, Tehsil Phagwara, Kapurthala district, in Punjab, India. The village is also known as Lakhpur Sahni. This village is located on the road from village Rawal-pindi to village Panchhata.

== Demographics ==
According to the 2001 Census, Sahni has a population of 1,264 people. Neighbouring villages include Lakhpur, Malikhpur, Nasirabad, Rampur Khalyan, Prempur, Harbanspur, Rampur Sunra and Bir Dhadoli.

Sahni is situated on the Phagwara-Hoshiarpur Road. It is 14 km from Phagwara, 29 km from Hoshiarpur, 35 km from Jalandhar and 55 km from Ludhiana. Most of the population belongs to Bangar, Kaushal and Kahlon clans. The village has a Government High School.
