= Babeli =

- village
- Location in Punjab, India Babeli (India)
- Coordinates: 31.3265°N 75.7701°E
- Country: India
- State: Punjab
- District: Kapurthala

Population (2001)
  - Total: 590

Languages
  - Official: Punjabi
- Time zone: UTC+5:30 (IST)
- Vehicle registration: PB-
- Coastline: 0 kilometres (0 mi)

Babeli is a village in Tehsil Phagwara, Kapurthala district, in Punjab, India.

== Demographics ==
According to the 2001 Census, Babeli has a population of 590.

== Gurdwara Chounta Sahib ==
According to local tradition, Guru Hargobind, the sixth Sikh guru visited Gurdwara Chounta Sahib. The first Babbar Shaheedi Conference was held at Gurdwara Chaunta Sahib in 1946.

== Gurdwara Babbar Shaheed ==
Babeli is famous for Gurdwara Babbar Shaheed. On 31 August 1923, an encounter took place at Babeli village between Babbar Akalis and the police that left four Babbars killed. Those killed were Baba Karam Singh Daulatpur, Baba Bishen Singh Mangat, Baba Uday Singh Rampur Jhuggian and Baba Mohinder Singh Pandori Ganga Singh. Locals state that the blood of the deceased turned the Narur choe water that flows near Babeli into the colour red. Since then the locals call the choe, the choe of the Babbars.

An annual Shaheedi Mela is held at Babeli village in memory of the martyrs.
