= Jandiala =

- Town
- Location in Punjab, India Jandiala (India)
- Coordinates: 31.17°N 75.62°E
- Country: India
- State: Punjab
- District: Jalandhar

Government
  - Type: Panchayati raj (India)
  - Body: Gram panchayat

Population (2011)
  - Total: 8,487

Languages
  - Official: Punjabi
- Time zone: IST

Jandiala is a village of the Jalandhar district situated in the Indian state of Punjab.

== Demographics ==
The table below shows the population of different religious groups in Jandiala town and their gender ratio, as of the 2011 census.

Population by religious groups in Jandiala town, 2011 census
Religion	Total	Female	Male	Gender ratio
Hindu	4,155	2,008	2,147	935
Sikh	3,950	1,907	2,043	933
Muslim	302	138	164	841
Christian	75	36	39	923
Total	8,487	4,092	4,395	931

== Housing ==
Jandiala's revenue records show that the total area of ownership of the village is 3399 acres out of which (according to the figures of 2006 census) the village is situated on 61 acres and farming is done on 2,989 acres. According to the 2006 census, the total number of houses is 1666.

== History ==
The people of Jandiala believe that the foundation stone of the town was laid in 1426 by a Johal Jat named Ladha. When Ladha settled down, he had laid the foundation of his camp with a jand tree called the Morhi Gadna. Due to this, the name of Ladha’s camp became Jandwala.

== Education ==
The only rural government college in Jalandhar is called the Guru Gobind Singh Government College Jandiala.

== Religion ==
People of religious devotion built fourteen gurdwaras, six temples, a mosque in the six pattis of the village. A khanga and a branch of Radha Swami Dera Beas have been built. The historic Gurdwara Dehura Sahib associated with Guru Arjan Dev Ji is situated on Jandiala.

== Sarpanches ==
The first panchayat elections were held in Jandiala after Indian independence in 1952. The details of the sarpanches elected since then are as follows:

- Giani Sohan Singh (1952 - 1962)
- Ajit Singh Johal (1962 - 1972)
- Swaran Singh Johal (1972 - 1977)
- Jagir Singh Johal (1977 - 1982)
- Baba Rajinder Singh Johal (1982 - 1993)
- Gurchetan Singh Johal (1993 - 1998)
- (no elections held from 1998 to 2003)
- Baba Rajinder Singh Johal (2003 - 2008)
- Narinder Kaur (2008 - 2013)
- Gurbakhsh Kaur Johal (2013 - 2018)
- Makhan Lal Pallan (2019 - 2024)
- Kamaljit Singh Sahota (2024-present)
