= Jatike =

- Village
- Location in Punjab, India Jatike (India)
- Coordinates: 31.438069°N 75.281447°E
- Country: India
- State: Punjab
- District: Kapurthala

Government
  - Type: Panchayati raj (India)
  - Body: Gram panchayat

Languages
  - Official: Punjabi
  - Other spoken: Hindi
- Time zone: UTC+5:30 (IST)
- Telephone code: 01822
- ISO 3166 code: IN-PB
- Vehicle registration: PB-09
- Website: kapurthala.gov.in

Jatike is a village in Kapurthala district of Punjab State, India. It is located 14.98 kilometres (9.31 mi) from Kapurthala, which is both district and sub-district headquarters of Jatike.

== Demography ==
According to the report published by Census India in 2011, Jatike has a total number of 190 houses and population of 946 of which include 493 males and 453 females.

== Caste ==
The village has schedule caste (SC) constitutes 30.44% of total population of the village and it doesn't have any Schedule Tribe (ST) population.

== Work activity ==
As per census 2011, 317 people were engaged in Main work activities out of the total population of Jatike which includes 286 males and 31 females. According to census survey report 2011, 96.85% workers describe their work as main work and 3.15% workers are involved in Marginal activity providing livelihood for less than 6 months. Of 317 workers engaged in Main Work, 124 were cultivators (owner or co-owner) while 90 were Agricultural labourers.

== Administration ==
The village is administrated by a Sarpanch who is an elected representative of village as per constitution of India and Panchayati raj (India).

Particulars	Total	Male	Female
Total No. of Houses	190		
Total	946	493	453
In the age group 0–6 years	93	56	37
Scheduled Castes (SC)	288	155	133
Scheduled Tribes (ST)	0	0	0
Literates	618	335	283
Illiterate	328	158	170
Total Worker	317	286	31
Main Worker	307	278	29
Main Worker - Cultivator	124	120	4
Main Worker - Agricultural Labourers	90	84	6
Main Worker - Household Industries	4	3	1
Main Worker - Other	89	71	18
Marginal Worker	10	8	2
Marginal Worker - Cultivator	2	1	1
Marginal Worker - Agriculture Labourers	2	2	0
Marginal Worker - Household Industries	1	0	1
Marginal Workers - Other	5	5	0
Marginal Worker (3-6 Months)	5	4	1
Marginal Worker - Cultivator (3-6 Months)	1	1	0
Marginal Worker - Agriculture Labourers (3-6 Months)	0	0	0
Marginal Worker - Household Industries (3-6 Months)	1	0	1
Marginal Worker - Other (3-6 Months)	3	3	0
Marginal Worker (0-3 Months)	5	4	1
Marginal Worker - Cultivator (0-3 Months)	1	0	1
Marginal Worker - Agriculture Labourers (0-3 Months)	2	2	0
Marginal Worker - Household Industries (0-3 Months)	0	0	0
Marginal Worker - Other Workers (0-3 Months)	2	2	0
Non Worker	629	207	422

== Air travel connectivity ==
The closest airport to the village is Sri Guru Ram Dass Jee International Airport.
