= Qualpur =

- Village
- Location in Punjab, India Qualpur (India)
- Coordinates: 31.233707°N 75.351420°E
- Country: India
- State: Punjab
- District: Kapurthala

Government
  - Type: Panchayati raj (India)
  - Body: Gram panchayat

Population (2011)
  - Total: 367
- Sex ratio 190/177♂/♀

Languages
  - Official: Punjabi
  - Other spoken: Hindi
- Time zone: UTC+5:30 (IST)
- PIN: 144625
- Telephone code: 01822
- ISO 3166 code: IN-PB
- Vehicle registration: PB-09
- Website: kapurthala.gov.in

Qualpur is a village in Kapurthala district of Punjab State, India. It is located 18 kilometres (11 mi) from Kapurthala, which is both district and sub-district headquarters of Qualpur. The village is administrated by a Sarpanch, who is an elected representative.

== Demography ==
According to the report published by Census India in 2011, Qualpur has total number of 68 houses and population of 367 of which include 190 males and 177 females. Literacy rate of Qualpur is 47.78%, lower than state average of 75.84%. The population of children under the age of 6 years is 74 which is 20.16% of total population of Qualpur, and child sex ratio is approximately 897, higher than state average of 846.

As per census 2011, 119 people were engaged in work activities out of the total population of Qualpur which includes 98 males and 21 females. According to census survey report 2011, 94.96% workers describe their work as main work and 5.04% workers are involved in Marginal activity providing livelihood for less than 6 months.

== Population data ==
| Particulars | Total | Male | Female |
|---|---|---|---|
| Total No. of Houses | 68 | - | - |
| Population | 367 | 190 | 177 |
| Child (0-6) | 74 | 39 | 35 |
| Schedule Caste | 349 | 179 | 170 |
| Schedule Tribe | 0 | 0 | 0 |
| Literacy | 47.78 % | 49.01 % | 46.48 % |
| Total Workers | 119 | 98 | 21 |
| Main Worker | 113 | 0 | 0 |
| Marginal Worker | 6 | 1 | 5 |

== Caste ==
The village has schedule caste (SC) constitutes 95.10% of total population of the village and it doesn't have any Schedule Tribe (ST) population.

== Air travel connectivity ==
The closest airport to the village is Sri Guru Ram Dass Jee International Airport.
