= Dhak Chachoki =

- Village
- Location in Punjab, India Dhak Chachoki (India)
- Coordinates: 31.201620°N 75.782206°E
- Country: India
- State: Punjab
- District: Kapurthala

Government
  - Type: Panchayati raj (India)
  - Body: Gram panchayat

Population (2011)
  - Total: 4,064
- Sex ratio 2205/1859♂/♀

Languages
  - Official: Punjabi
  - Other spoken: Hindi
- Time zone: UTC+5:30 (IST)
- PIN: 144401
- Telephone code: 01822
- ISO 3166 code: IN-PB
- Vehicle registration: PB-09
- Website: kapurthala.gov.in

Dhak Chachoki is a village in Phagwara Tehsil in Kapurthala district of Punjab State, India. It is located 42 kilometres (26 mi) from Kapurthala, 2 kilometres (1.2 mi) from Phagwara. The village is administrated by a Sarpanch who is an elected representative of village as per the constitution of India and Panchayati raj (India).

== Demography ==
According to the report published by Census India in 2011, Dhak Chachoki has 916 houses with the total population of 4,064 persons of which 2,205 are male and 1,859 females. Literacy rate of Dhak Chachoki is 85.43%, higher than the state average of 75.84%. The population of children in the age group 0–6 years is 439 which is 10.80% of the total population. Child sex ratio is approximately 852, higher than the state average of 846.

As per census 2011, 1,432 people were engaged in work activities out of the total population of Dhak Chachoki which includes 1,206 males and 226 females. According to census survey report 2011, 90.36% workers (Employment or Earning more than 6 Months) describe their work as main work and 9.64% workers are involved in Marginal activity providing livelihood for less than 6 months.

== Population data ==
Particulars	Total	Male	Female
Total No. of Houses	916	-	-
Population	4,064	2,205	1,859
Child (0-6)	439	237	202
Schedule Caste	1,255	657	598
Schedule Tribe	0	0	0
Literacy	85.43 %	89.58 %	80.51 %
Total Workers	1,432	1,206	226
Main Worker	1,294	0	0
Marginal Worker	138	109	29

== Caste ==
The village has schedule caste (SC) constitutes 30.88% of total population of the village and it doesn't have any Schedule Tribe (ST) population.
