= Dhawankhan Nishan =

- Village
- Location in Punjab, India Dhawankhan Nishan (India)
- Coordinates: 31.365907°N 75.430103°E
- Country: India
- State: Punjab
- District: Kapurthala

Government
  - Type: Panchayati raj (India)
  - Body: Gram panchayat

Population (2011)
  - Total: 234
- Sex ratio 118/116♂/♀

Languages
  - Official: Punjabi
  - Other spoken: Hindi
- Time zone: UTC+5:30 (IST)
- PIN: 144601
- Telephone code: 01822
- ISO 3166 code: IN-PB
- Vehicle registration: PB-09
- Website: kapurthala.gov.in

Dhawankhan Nishan is a village in Kapurthala district of Punjab State, India. It is located 5 kilometres (3.1 mi) from Kapurthala, which is both district and sub-district headquarters of Dhawankhan Nishan. The village is administrated by a Sarpanch, who is an elected representative.

== Demography ==
According to the report published by Census India in 2011, Dhawankhan Nishan has a total number of 45 houses and population of 234 of which include 118 males and 116 females. Literacy rate of Dhawankhan Nishan is 73.93%, lower than state average of 75.84%. The population of children under the age of 6 years is 23 which is 9.83% of total population of Dhawankhan Nishan, and child sex ratio is approximately 1556, higher than state average of 846.

As per census 2011, 87 people were engaged in work activities out of the total population of Dhawankhan Nishan which includes 65 males and 22 females. According to the 2011 census survey report, 100.00% workers describe their work as main work and 0.00% workers are involved in marginal activity providing livelihood for less than six months.

== Population data ==
Particulars	Total	Male	Female
Total No. of Houses	45	-	-
Population	234	118	116
Child (0-6)	23	9	14
Schedule Caste	5	4	1
Schedule Tribe	0	0	0
Literacy	73.93 %	77.98 %	69.61 %
Total Workers	87	65	22
Main Worker	87	0	0
Marginal Worker	0	0	0

== Caste ==
The village has schedule caste (SC) constitutes 2.14% of total population of the village and it doesn't have any Schedule Tribe (ST) population.

== Air travel connectivity ==
The closest airport to the village is Sri Guru Ram Dass Jee International Airport.
