= Dhudianwala =

Dhudianwal
- Village
- Location in Punjab, India Dhudianwal (India)
- Coordinates: 31.338662°N 75.339486°E
- Country: India
- State: Punjab
- District: Kapurthala

Government
  - Type: Panchayati raj (India)
  - Body: Gram panchayat

Population (2011)
  - Total: 3,167
- Sex ratio 1669/1498♂/♀

Languages
  - Official: Punjabi
  - Other spoken: Hindi
- Time zone: UTC+5:30 (IST)
- PIN: 144620
- Telephone code: 01822
- ISO 3166 code: IN-PB
- Vehicle registration: PB-09
- Website: kapurthala.gov.in

Dhudianwala is a village in Kapurthala district of Punjab State, India. It is located 7 kilometres (4.3 mi) from Kapurthala, which is both district and sub-district headquarters of Dhudianwala. The village is administrated by a Sarpanch, who is an elected representative.

== Demography ==
According to the report published by Census India in 2011, Dhudianwala has a total number of 686 houses and population of 3,167 of which include 1,669 males and 1,498 females. Literacy rate of Dhudianwala is 82.69%, higher than state average of 75.84%. The population of children under the age of 6 years is 389 which is 12.28% of total population of Dhudianwala, and child sex ratio is approximately 898, higher than state average of 846.

As per census 2011, 1,009 people were engaged in work activities out of the total population of Dhudianwala which includes 851 males and 158 females. According to census survey report 2011, 98.41% workers describe their work as main work and 1.59% workers are involved in Marginal activity providing livelihood for less than 6 months.

== Population data ==
Particulars	Total	Male	Female
Total No. of Houses	686	-	-
Population	3,167	1,669	1,498
Child (0-6)	389	205	184
Schedule Caste	642	342	300
Schedule Tribe	0	0	0
Literacy	82.69 %	86.48 %	78.46 %
Total Workers	1,009	851	158
Main Worker	993	0	0
Marginal Worker	16	7	9

== Caste ==
The village has schedule caste (SC) constitutes 20.27% of total population of the village and it doesn't have any Schedule Tribe (ST) population.

== Air travel connectivity ==
The closest airport to the village is Sri Guru Ram Dass Jee International Airport.
