= Dialpur =

Dayalpur
- Village
- Location in Punjab, India Dayalpur (India)
- Coordinates: 31.455594°N 75.456321°E
- Country: India
- State: Punjab
- District: Kapurthala

Government
  - Type: Panchayati raj (India)
  - Body: Gram panchayat

Population (2011)
  - Total: 3,995
- Sex ratio 2240/1755♂/♀

Languages
  - Official: Punjabi
  - Other spoken: Hindi
- Time zone: UTC+5:30 (IST)
- PIN: 144803
- Telephone code: 01822
- ISO 3166 code: IN-PB
- Vehicle registration: PB-08/09
- Website: kapurthala.gov.in

Dialpur (ਦਿਆਲਪੁਰ) or Dayalpur (ਦਿਆਲਪੁਰ) is a village in Jalandhar district as well as Kapurthala district of Punjab State, India. It is located 13 kilometres (8.1 mi) from Kapurthala, which is both district and sub-district headquarters of Dialpur. The village is unique as it is one of the few villages that falls under two districts of Punjab. The village is administrated by a Sarpanch who is an elected representative of village as per the constitution of India and Panchayati raj (India).

== Demography ==
According to the report published by Census India in 2011, Dialpur has a total number of 918 houses and population of 3,995 of which include 2,240 males and 1,755 females. Literacy rate of Dialpur is 80.29%, higher than state average of 75.84%. The population of children under the age of 6 years is 398 which is 9.96% of total population of Dialpur, and child sex ratio is approximately 785, lower than state average of 846.

== Caste ==
The village has schedule caste (SC) constitutes 28.89% of total population of the village and it doesn't have any Schedule Tribe (ST) population,

== Population data ==
Particulars	Total	Male	Female
Total No. of Houses	918	-	-
Population	3,995	2,240	1,755
Child (0-6)	398	223	175
Schedule Caste	1,154	619	535
Schedule Tribe	0	0	0
Literacy	80.29 %	85.67 %	73.42 %
Total Workers	1,369	1,244	125
Main Worker	1,276	0	0
Marginal Worker	93	59	34

== Air travel connectivity ==
The closest airport to the village is Sri Guru Ram Dass Jee International Airport.
