= Nurpur Dona =

- Village
- Location in Punjab, India Nurpur Dona (India)
- Coordinates: 31.384133°N 75.418449°E
- Country: India
- State: Punjab
- District: Kapurthala

Government
  - Type: Panchayati raj (India)
  - Body: Gram panchayat

Population (2011)
  - Total: 1,179
- Sex ratio 613/566♂/♀

Languages
  - Official: Punjabi
  - Other spoken: Hindi
- Time zone: UTC+5:30 (IST)
- PIN: 144601
- Telephone code: 01822
- ISO 3166 code: IN-PB
- Vehicle registration: PB-09
- Website: kapurthala.gov.in

Nurpur Dona is a village in Kapurthala district of Punjab State, India. It is located 3 kilometres (1.9 mi) from Kapurthala, which is both district and sub-district headquarters of Nurpur Dona. The village is administrated by a Sarpanch who is an elected representative.

== Demography ==
According to the report published by Census India in 2011, Nurpur Dona has total number of 246 houses and population of 1,179 of which include 613 males and 566 females. Literacy rate of Nurpur Dona is 76.35%, higher than state average of 75.84%. The population of children under the age of 6 years is 122 which is 10.35% of total population of Nurpur Dona, and child sex ratio is approximately 1033, higher than state average of 846.

As per census 2011, 417 people were engaged in work activities out of the total population of Nurpur Dona which includes 323 males and 94 females. According to census survey report 2011, 82.01% workers describe their work as main work and 17.99% workers are involved in Marginal activity providing livelihood for less than 6 months.

== Population data ==
Particulars	Total	Male	Female
Total No. of Houses	246	-	-
Population	1,179	613	566
Child (0-6)	122	60	62
Schedule Caste	1,101	571	530
Schedule Tribe	0	0	0
Literacy	76.35 %	82.82 %	69.25 %
Total Workers	417	323	94
Main Worker	342	0	0
Marginal Worker	75	44	31

== Caste ==
The village has schedule caste (SC) constitutes 93.38% of total population of the village and it does not have any Schedule Tribe (ST) population.

== Air travel connectivity ==
The closest airport to the village is Sri Guru Ram Dass Jee International Airport.
