= Khera, Nangal =

Khera Khera-Nangal
- village
- Location in Punjab, India Khera (India)
- Coordinates: 31°11′47.98″N 75°45′24.38″E
- Country: India
- State: Punjab
- District: Kapurthala

Population (2001)
  - Total: 2,241

Languages
  - Official: Punjabi
- Time zone: UTC+5:30 (IST)
- Vehicle registration: PB-

Khera is a village in Phagwara tehsil, Kapurthala district in Punjab, India.

According to the 2001 Census, Khera has a population of 2,241 people. Khera is close to the city of Phagwara. Neighbouring villages include Nangal, Gobindpura, Bhanoki, Thakkraki, Mouli.

Khera Road leads straight from Phagwara City into Khera village. Together with the neighbouring village of Nangal, the area is known as Nangal-Khera. Khera has two gurdwaras and a government school.
