= Bhanoki =

- Village
- Location in Punjab, India Bhanoki (India)
- Coordinates: 31.196262°N 75.740783°E
- Country: India
- State: Punjab
- District: Kapurthala

Government
  - Type: Panchayati raj (India)
  - Body: Gram panchayat

Population (2011)
  - Total: 2,351
- Sex ratio 1220/1131 ♂/♀

Languages
  - Official: Punjabi
  - Other spoken: Hindi
- Time zone: UTC+5:30 (IST)
- PIN: 144401
- Telephone code: 01824
- ISO 3166 code: IN-PB
- Vehicle registration: PB-09
- Website: kapurthala.gov.in

Bhanoki is a village in Tehsil Phagwara, Kapurthala district, in Punjab, India. It is located 3 kilometres (1.9 mi) away from sub-district headquarter Phagwara and 50 km away from district headquarter Kapurthala. The village is administrated by a Sarpanch, who is an elected representative.

== Transport ==
Phagwara Junction Railway Station, Mauli Halt Railway Station are the nearby railway stations to Bhanoki, however, Jalandhar City Rail Way station is 23 km away from the village. The village is 117 km away from Sri Guru Ram Dass Jee International Airport in Amritsar, another near airport is Sahnewal Airport in Ludhiana which is located 37 km away from the village.
