= Hradaspur =

- Village
- Location in Punjab, India Hradaspur (India)
- Coordinates: 31.246063°N 75.710254°E
- Country: India
- State: Punjab
- District: Kapurthala

Government
  - Type: Panchayati raj (India)
  - Body: Gram panchayat

Population (2011)
  - Total: 1,472
- Sex ratio 711/761♂/♀

Languages
  - Official: Punjabi
  - Other spoken: Hindi
- Time zone: UTC+5:30 (IST)
- PIN: 144401
- Telephone code: 01822
- ISO 3166 code: IN-PB
- Vehicle registration: PB-09
- Website: kapurthala.gov.in

Hradaspur is a village in Phagwara Tehsil in Kapurthala district of Punjab State, India. It is located 35 kilometres (22 mi) from Kapurthala, 5 kilometres (3.1 mi) from Phagwara. The village is administrated by a Sarpanch, who is an elected representative.

== Demography ==
According to the report published by Census India in 2011, Hradaspur has 328 houses with the total population of 1,472 persons of which 711 are male and 761 females. Literacy rate of Hradaspur is 83.17%, higher than the state average of 75.84%. The population of children in the age group 0–6 years is 159 which is 10.80% of the total population. Child sex ratio is approximately 1208, higher than the state average of 846.

== Population data ==
Particulars	Total	Male	Female
Total No. of Houses	328	-	-
Population	1,472	711	761
Child (0-6)	159	72	87
Schedule Caste	831	406	425
Schedule Tribe	0	0	0
Literacy	83.17 %	88.11 %	78.49 %
Total Workers	518	405	113
Main Worker	502	0	0
Marginal Worker	16	7	9

As per census 2011, 518 people were engaged in work activities out of the total population of Hradaspur village which includes 405 males and 113 females. According to census survey report 2011, 96.91% workers (Employment or Earning more than 6 Months) describe their work as main work and 3.09% workers are involved in Marginal activity providing livelihood for less than 6 months.

== Caste ==
The village has schedule caste (SC) constitutes 56.45% of total population of the village and it doesn't have any Schedule Tribe (ST) population.
