= Dainwind =

- Village
- Location in Punjab, India Dainwind (India)
- Coordinates: 31.405942°N 75.425732°E
- Country: India
- State: Punjab
- District: Kapurthala

Government
  - Type: Panchayati raj (India)
  - Body: Gram panchayat

Population (2011)
  - Total: 892
- Sex ratio 448/444♂/♀

Languages
  - Official: Punjabi
  - Other spoken: Hindi
- Time zone: UTC+5:30 (IST)
- PIN: 144601
- Telephone code: 01822
- ISO 3166 code: IN-PB
- Vehicle registration: PB-09
- Website: kapurthala.gov.in

Dainwind is a village in Kapurthala district of Punjab State, India. It is located 5.5 kilometres (3.4 mi) from Kapurthala, which is both district and sub-district headquarters of Dainwind. The village is administrated by a Sarpanch, who is an elected representative.

== Demography ==
According to the report published by Census India in 2011, Dainwind has a total number of 187 houses and population of 892 of which include 448 males and 444 females. Literacy rate of Dainwind is 64.30%, lower than state average of 75.84%. The population of children under the age of 6 years is 133 which is 14.91% of total population of Dainwind, and child sex ratio is approximately 928, higher than state average of 846.

== Population data ==
Particulars	Total	Male	Female
Total No. of Houses	187	-	-
Population	892	448	444
Child (0–6)	133	69	64
Schedule Caste	713	355	358
Schedule Tribe	0	0	0
Literacy	64.30%	67.28%	61.32%
Total Workers	336	271	65
Main Worker	254	0	0
Marginal Worker	82	62	20

== Caste ==
The village has schedule caste (SC) constitutes 79.93% of total population of the village and it doesn't have any Schedule Tribe (ST) population.

== Transport ==
=== Air ===
The nearest domestic airport is located 79.19 km away in Ludhiana and the nearest international airport is Sri Guru Ram Dass Jee International Airport is the nearest airport which is 68.45 km away in Amritsar.

== Air travel connectivity ==
The closest airport to the village is Sri Guru Ram Dass Jee International Airport.
