= Nurpur Lubhana =

- Village
- Location in Punjab, India Nurpur Lubhana (India)
- Coordinates: 31.464218°N 75.349963°E
- Country: India
- State: Punjab
- District: Kapurthala

Government
  - Type: Panchayati raj (India)
  - Body: Gram panchayat

Population (2011)
  - Total: 1,525
- Sex ratio 793/732♂/♀

Languages
  - Official: Punjabi
  - Other spoken: Hindi
- Time zone: UTC+5:30 (IST)
- PIN: 144601
- Telephone code: 01822
- ISO 3166 code: IN-PB
- Vehicle registration: PB-09
- Website: kapurthala.gov.in

Nurpur Lubhana is a village in Kapurthala district of Punjab State, India. It is located 12 kilometres (7.5 mi) from Kapurthala, which is both district and sub-district headquarters of Nurpur Lubhana. The village is administrated by a Sarpanch, who is an elected representative.

== Demography ==
According to the report published by Census India in 2011, Nurpur Lubhana has total number of 334 houses and population of 1,525 of which include 793 males and 732 females. Literacy rate of Nurpur Lubhana is 86.17%, higher than state average of 75.84%. The population of children under the age of 6 years is 173 which is 11.34% of total population of Nurpur Lubhana, and child sex ratio is approximately 713, lower than state average of 846.

As per census 2011, 628 people were engaged in work activities out of the total population of Nurpur Lubhana which includes 401 males and 227 females. According to census survey report 2011, 84.87% workers describe their work as main work and 15.13% workers are involved in Marginal activity providing livelihood for less than 6 months.

== Population data ==
Particulars	Total	Male	Female
Total No. of Houses	334	-	-
Population	1,525	793	732
Child (0-6)	173	101	72
Schedule Caste	339	179	160
Schedule Tribe	0	0	0
Literacy	86.17 %	91.47 %	80.61 %
Total Workers	628	401	227
Main Worker	533	0	0
Marginal Worker	95	67	28

== Air travel connectivity ==
The closest airport to the village is Sri Guru Ram Dass Jee International Airport.
