= Mand Sangojla =

- Village
- Location in Punjab, India Mand Sangojla (India)
- Coordinates: 31.441609°N 75.263948°E
- Country: India
- State: Punjab
- District: Kapurthala

Government
  - Type: Panchayati raj (India)
  - Body: Gram panchayat

Population (2011)
  - Total: 419
- Sex ratio 228/191♂/♀

Languages
  - Official: Punjabi
  - Other spoken: Hindi
- Time zone: UTC+5:30 (IST)
- PIN: 144601
- Telephone code: 01822
- ISO 3166 code: IN-PB
- Vehicle registration: PB-09
- Website: kapurthala.gov.in

Mand Sangojla is a village in Kapurthala district of Punjab State, India. It is located 20 kilometres (12 mi) from Kapurthala, which is both district and sub-district headquarters of Mand Sangojla. The village is administrated by a Sarpanch, who is an elected representative.

== Demography ==
According to the report published by Census India in 2011, Mand Sangojla has 76 houses with the total population of 419 persons of which 228 are male and 191 females. Literacy rate of Mand Sangojla is 63.93%, lower than the state average of 75.84%. The population of children in the age group 0–6 years is 53 which is 12.65% of the total population. Child sex ratio is approximately 710, lower than the state average of 846.

As per census 2011, 135 people were engaged in work activities out of the total population of Mand Sangojla which includes 123 males and 12 females. According to census survey report 2011, 92.59% workers describe their work as main work and 7.41% workers are involved in Marginal activity providing livelihood for less than 6 months.

== Population data ==
Particulars	Total	Male	Female
Total No. of Houses	76	-	-
Population	419	228	191
Child (0-6)	53	31	22
Schedule Caste	281	158	123
Schedule Tribe	0	0	0
Literacy	63.93 %	68.53 %	58.58 %
Total Workers	135	123	12
Main Worker	125	0	0
Marginal Worker	10	6	4

== Caste ==
The village has schedule caste (SC) constitutes 67.06% of total population of the village and it doesn't have any Schedule Tribe (ST) population.
