= Badyal =

- Village
- Location in Punjab, India Badyal (India)
- Coordinates: 31.255896°N 75.398052°E
- Country: India
- State: Punjab
- District: Kapurthala

Government
  - Type: Panchayati raj (India)
  - Body: Gram panchayat

Population (2011)
  - Total: 375
- Sex ratio 175/200♂/♀

Languages
  - Official: Punjabi
  - Other spoken: Hindi
- Time zone: UTC+5:30 (IST)
- PIN: 144625
- Telephone code: 01822
- ISO 3166 code: IN-PB
- Vehicle registration: PB-09
- Website: kapurthala.gov.in

Badyal is a village in Kapurthala district of Punjab State, India. It is located 18 kilometres (11 mi) from Kapurthala, which is both district and sub-district headquarters of Badyal. The village is administrated by a Sarpanch who is an elected representative of village as per the constitution of India and Panchayati raj (India).

== Demography ==
According to the report published by Census India in 2011, Badyal has a total number of 78 houses and population of 375 of which include 175 males and 200 females. Literacy rate of Badyal is 66.36%, lower than state average of 75.84%. The population of children under the age of 6 years is 51 which is 13.60% of total population of Badyal, and child sex ratio is approximately 1217 higher than state average of 846.

== Population data ==
| Particulars | Total | Male | Female |
|---|---|---|---|
| Total No. of Houses | 78 | - | - |
| Population | 375 | 175 | 200 |
| Child (0–6) | 51 | 23 | 28 |
| Schedule Caste | 110 | 56 | 54 |
| Schedule Tribe | 0 | 0 | 0 |
| Literacy | 66.36 % | 68.42 % | 64.53 % |
| Total Workers | 120 | 95 | 25 |
| Main Worker | 78 | 0 | 0 |
| Marginal Worker | 42 | 28 | 14 |

== Air travel connectivity ==
The closest airport to the village is Sri Guru Ram Dass Jee International Airport.
