= Phiali =

- Village
- Location in Punjab, India Phiali (India)
- Coordinates: 31.376986°N 75.453408°E
- Country: India
- State: Punjab
- District: Kapurthala

Government
  - Type: Panchayati raj (India)
  - Body: Gram panchayat

Population (2011)
  - Total: 576
- Sex ratio 285/291♂/♀

Languages
  - Official: Punjabi
  - Other spoken: Hindi
- Time zone: UTC+5:30 (IST)
- PIN: 144601
- Telephone code: 01822
- ISO 3166 code: IN-PB
- Vehicle registration: PB-09
- Website: kapurthala.gov.in

Phiali is a village in Kapurthala district of Punjab State, India. It is located 10 kilometres (6.2 mi) from Kapurthala, which is both district and sub-district headquarters of Phiali. The village is administrated by a Sarpanch, who is an elected representative.

== Demography ==
According to the report published by Census India in 2011, Phiali has 118 houses with the total population of 576 persons of which 285 are male and 291 females. Literacy rate of Phiali is 62.98%, lower than the state average of 75.84%. The population of children in the age group 0–6 years is 52 which is 9.03% of the total population. Child sex ratio is approximately 1261, higher than the state average of 846.

== Population data ==
Particulars	Total	Male	Female
Total No. of Houses	118	-	-
Population	576	285	291
Child (0–6)	52	23	29
Schedule Caste	269	129	140
Schedule Tribe	0	0	0
Literacy	62.98 %	68.32 %	57.63 %
Total Workers	231	170	61
Main Worker	221	0	0
Marginal Worker	10	5	5

== Transport ==
Kapurthala Railway Station, Rail Coach Fact Railway Station are the nearby railway stations. Jalandhar City Railway station is 23 km away from the village. The village is 73 km away from Sri Guru Ram Dass Jee International Airport in Amritsar. Another nearby airport is Sahnewal Airport in Ludhiana which is located 77 km away from the village.
