= Ratra, Kapurthala =

Ratra
- Village
- Location in Punjab, India Ratra (India)
- Coordinates: 31.389674°N 75.226028°E
- Country: India
- State: Punjab
- District: Kapurthala

Government
  - Type: Panchayati raj (India)
  - Body: Gram panchayat

Population (2011)
  - Total: 452
- Sex ratio 257/195♂/♀

Languages
  - Official: Punjabi
  - Other spoken: Hindi
- Time zone: UTC+5:30 (IST)
- PIN: 144601
- Telephone code: 01822
- ISO 3166 code: IN-PB
- Vehicle registration: PB-09
- Website: kapurthala.gov.in

Ratra is a village in the Kapurthala district of Punjab State, India. It is located 16 kilometres (9.9 mi) from Kapurthala, which is both the district and sub-district headquarters of Ratra. The village is administrated by a Sarpanch, who is an elected representative.

== Demography ==
According to the report published by Census India in 2011, Ratra has total number of 91 houses and population of 452 of which include 257 males and 195 females. Literacy rate of Ratra is 85.22%, higher than state average of 75.84%. The population of children under the age of 6 years is 46 which is 10.18% of total population of Ratra, and child sex ratio is approximately 769, lower than state average of 846.

== Population data ==
| Particulars | Total | Male | Female |
|---|---|---|---|
| Total No. of Houses | 91 | - | - |
| Population | 452 | 257 | 195 |
| Child (0–6) | 46 | 26 | 20 |
| Schedule Caste | 220 | 126 | 94 |
| Schedule Tribe | 0 | 0 | 0 |
| Literacy | 85.22 % | 89.18 % | 80.00 % |
| Total Workers | 277 | 160 | 117 |
| Main Worker | 273 | 0 | 0 |
| Marginal Worker | 4 | 4 | 0 |

== Air travel connectivity ==
The closest airport to the village is Sri Guru Ram Dass Jee International Airport.
