= Dhandal =

- Village
- Location in Punjab, India Dhandal (India)
- Coordinates: 31.315782°N 75.419905°E
- Country: India
- State: Punjab
- District: Kapurthala

Government
  - Type: Panchayati raj (India)
  - Body: Gram panchayat

Population (2011)
  - Total: 524
- Sex ratio 261/263♂/♀

Languages
  - Official: Punjabi
  - Other spoken: Hindi
- Time zone: UTC+5:30 (IST)
- PIN: 144601
- Telephone code: 01822
- ISO 3166 code: IN-PB
- Vehicle registration: PB-09
- Website: kapurthala.gov.in

Dhandal is a village in Kapurthala district of Punjab State, India. It is located 10.8 kilometres (6.7 mi) from Kapurthala, which is both district and sub-district headquarters of Dhandal. The village is administrated by a Sarpanch who is an elected representative of village as per the constitution of India and Panchayati raj (India).

== Demography ==
According to the report published by Census India in 2011, Dhandal has a total number of 122 houses and population of 524 of which include 261 males and 263 females. Literacy rate of Dhandal is 60.14%, lower than state average of 75.84%. The population of children under the age of 6 years is 95 which is 18.13% of total population of Dhandal, and child sex ratio is approximately 1065, higher than state average of 846.

== Caste ==
The village has schedule caste (SC) constitutes 52.48% of total population of the village and it doesn't have any Schedule Tribe (ST) population,

== Population data ==
Particulars	Total	Male	Female
Total No. of Houses	122	-	-
Population	524	261	263
Child (0-6)	95	46	49
Schedule Caste	275	137	138
Schedule Tribe	0	0	0
Literacy	60.14 %	65.12 %	55.14 %
Total Workers	194	143	51
Main Worker	194	0	0
Marginal Worker	0	0	0

== Air travel connectivity ==
The closest airport to the village is Sri Guru Ram Dass Jee International Airport.
