= Khera Dona =

- Village
- Location in Punjab, India Khera Dona (India)
- Coordinates: 31.147130°N 75.341218°E
- Country: India
- State: Punjab
- District: Kapurthala

Government
  - Type: Panchayati raj (India)
  - Body: Gram panchayat

Population (2011)
  - Total: 1,802
- Sex ratio 920/882♂/♀

Languages
  - Official: Punjabi
  - Other spoken: Hindi
- Time zone: UTC+5:30 (IST)
- PIN: 144620
- Telephone code: 01822
- ISO 3166 code: IN-PB
- Vehicle registration: PB-09
- Website: kapurthala.gov.in

Khera Dona is a village in Kapurthala district of Punjab State, India. It is located 12 kilometres (7.5 mi) from Kapurthala, which is both district and sub-district headquarters of Khera Dona. The village is administrated by a Sarpanch, Kuljinder Singh, who is an elected representative of village as per the constitution of India and Panchayati raj (India). The next heir to the Sarpanch line is Anoop Singh, the eldest son.

== Demography ==
According to the report published by Census India in 2011, Khera Dona has total number of 379 houses and population of 1,802 of which include 920 males and 882 females. Literacy rate of Khera Dona is 79.50%, higher than state average of 75.84%. The population of children under the age of 6 years is 153 which is 8.49% of total population of Khera Dona, and child sex ratio is approximately 889, higher than state average of 846.

== Population data ==
Particulars	Total	Male	Female
Total No. of Houses	379	-	-
Population	1,802	920	882
Child (0-6)	153	81	72
Schedule Caste	701	365	336
Schedule Tribe	0	0	0
Literacy	79.50 %	84.51 %	74.32 %
Total Workers	554	474	80
Main Worker	438	0	0
Marginal Worker	116	84	32

== Air travel connectivity ==
The closest airport to the village is Sri Guru Ram Dass Jee International Airport.
