= Chuharwal =

- Village
- Location in Punjab, India Chuharwal (India)
- Coordinates: 31.001628°N 75.894785°E
- Country: India
- State: Punjab
- District: Kapurthala

Government
  - Type: Panchayati raj (India)
  - Body: Gram panchayat

Population (2011)
  - Total: 802
- Sex ratio 400/402♂/♀

Languages
  - Official: Punjabi
  - Other spoken: Hindi
- Time zone: UTC+5:30 (IST)
- PIN: 144601
- Telephone code: 01822
- ISO 3166 code: IN-PB
- Vehicle registration: PB-09
- Website: kapurthala.gov.in

Chuharwal is a village in Kapurthala district of Punjab State, India. It is located 8 kilometres (5.0 mi) from Kapurthala, which is both district and sub-district headquarters of Chuharwal. The village is administrated by a Sarpanch, who is an elected representative.

== Demography ==
According to the report published by Census India in 2011, Chuharwal has a total number of 176 houses and a population of 802, which include 400 males and 402 females. Literacy rate of Chuharwal is 51,44%, lower than state average of 75.84%. The population of children under the age of 6 years is 143 which is 17.83% of total population of Chuharwal, and child sex ratio is approximately 907, higher than state average of 846.

== Caste ==
The village has schedule caste (SC) constitutes 78.80% of total population of the village and it doesn't have any Schedule Tribe (ST) population.

== Population data ==
Particulars	Total	Male	Female
Total No. of Houses	176	-	-
Population	802	400	402
Child (0-6)	143	75	68
Schedule Caste	632	311	321
Schedule Tribe	0	0	0
Literacy	51.44 %	57.54 %	45.51 %
Total Workers	313	215	98
Main Worker	83	0	0
Marginal Worker	230	143	87

== Air travel connectivity ==
The closest airport to the village is Sri Guru Ram Dass Jee International Airport.
