= Desal, Kapurthala =

Desal
- Village
- Location in Punjab, India Desal (India)
- Coordinates: 31.400166°N 75.220193°E
- Country: India
- State: Punjab
- District: Kapurthala

Government
  - Type: Panchayati raj (India)
  - Body: Gram panchayat

Population (2011)
  - Total: 1,433
- Sex ratio 763/670♂/♀

Languages
  - Official: Punjabi
  - Other spoken: Hindi
- Time zone: UTC+5:30 (IST)
- PIN: 144804
- Telephone code: 01822
- ISO 3166 code: IN-PB
- Vehicle registration: PB-09
- Website: kapurthala.gov.in

Desal is a village in Kapurthala district of Punjab State, India. It is located 20 kilometres (12 mi) from Kapurthala, which is both district and sub-district headquarters of Desal. The village is administrated by a Sarpanch, who is an elected representative.

== Demography ==
According to the report published by Census India in 2011, Desal has a total number of 266 houses and population of 1,433 of which include 763 males and 670 females. Literacy rate of Desal is 68.43%, lower than state average of 75.84%. The population of children under the age of 6 years is 169 which is 11.79% of total population of Desal, and child sex ratio is approximately 1012, higher than state average of 846.

== Caste ==
The village has schedule caste (SC) constitutes 81.02% of total population of the village and it doesn't have any Schedule Tribe (ST) population.

== Population data ==
Particulars	Total	Male	Female
Total No. of Houses	266	-	-
Population	1,433	763	670
Child (0-6)	169	84	85
Schedule Caste	1,161	614	547
Schedule Tribe	0	0	0
Literacy	68.43 %	72.90 %	63.25 %
Total Workers	517	431	86
Main Worker	507	0	0
Marginal Worker	10	9	1

== Air travel connectivity ==
The closest airport to the village is Sri Guru Ram Dass Jee International Airport.
