= Bhandal Bet =

- Village
- Location in Punjab, India Bhandal Bet (India)
- Coordinates: 31.447839°N 75.289788°E
- Country: India
- State: Punjab
- District: Kapurthala

Government
  - Type: Panchayati raj (India)
  - Body: Gram panchayat

Population (2011)
  - Total: 2,884
- Sex ratio 1486/1398♂/♀

Languages
  - Official: Punjabi
  - Other spoken: Hindi
- Time zone: UTC+5:30 (IST)
- PIN: 144804
- Telephone code: 01822
- ISO 3166 code: IN-PB
- Vehicle registration: PB-09
- Website: kapurthala.gov.in

Bhandal Bet is a village in Kapurthala district of Punjab State, India. It is located 14 kilometres (8.7 mi) from Kapurthala, which is both district and sub-district headquarters of Bhandal Bet. The village is administrated by a Sarpanch, who is an elected representative.school bhandal public school Singer jaimalbhandal

== Demography ==
According to the report published by Census India in 2011, Bhandal Bet has a total number of 585 houses and population of 2,884 of which include 1,486 males and 1,398 females. Literacy rate of Bhandal Bet is 76.45%, higher than state average of 75.84%. The population of children under the age of 6 years is 306 which is 10.61% of total population of Bhandal Bet, and child sex ratio is approximately 889, higher than state average of 846.

== Population data ==
Particulars	Total	Male	Female
Total No. of Houses	585	-	-
Population	2,884	1,486	1,398
Child (0–6)	306	162	144
Schedule Caste	877	451	426
Schedule Tribe	0	0	0
Literacy	76.45 %	81.19 %	71.45 %
Total Workers	1,209	848	361
Main Worker	977	0	0
Marginal Worker	232	83	149

== Air travel connectivity ==
The closest airport to the village is Sri Guru Ram Dass Jee International Airport.
