= Mansurwal Dona =

- Village
- Location in Punjab, India Mansurwal Dona (India)
- Coordinates: 31.364104°N 75.402423°E
- Country: India
- State: Punjab
- District: Kapurthala

Government
  - Type: Panchayati raj (India)
  - Body: Gram panchayat

Population (2011)
  - Total: 644
- Sex ratio 340/304♂/♀

Languages
  - Official: Punjabi
  - Other spoken: Hindi
- Time zone: UTC+5:30 (IST)
- PIN: 144601
- Telephone code: 01822
- ISO 3166 code: IN-PB
- Vehicle registration: PB-09
- Website: kapurthala.gov.in

Mansurwal Dona is a village in Kapurthala district of Punjab State, India. It is located 3 kilometres (1.9 mi) from Kapurthala, which is both district and sub-district headquarters of Mansurwal Dona. The village is administrated by a Sarpanch, who is an elected representative.

== Demography ==
According to the report published by Census India in 2011, Mansurwal Dona has 124 houses with the total population of 644 persons of which 340 are male and 304 females. Literacy rate of Mansurwal Dona is 68.41%, lower than the state average of 75.84%. The population of children in the age group 0–6 years is 90 which is 13.98% of the total population. Child sex ratio is approximately 915, higher than the state average of 846.

== Population data ==
| Particulars | Total | Male | Female |
|---|---|---|---|
| Total No. of Houses | 124 | - | - |
| Population | 644 | 340 | 304 |
| Child (0-6) | 90 | 47 | 43 |
| Schedule Caste | 410 | 217 | 193 |
| Schedule Tribe | 0 | 0 0 | |
| Literacy | 68.41 % | 76.11 % | 59.77 % |
| Total Workers | 243 | 225 | 18 |
| Main Worker | 243 | 0 | 0 |
| Marginal Worker | 0 | 0 | 0 |
