= Dham, Kapurthala =

Dham
- Village
- Location in Punjab, India Dham (India)
- Coordinates: 31.438778°N 75.383481°E
- Country: India
- State: Punjab
- District: Kapurthala

Government
  - Type: Panchayati raj (India)
  - Body: Gram panchayat

Population (2011)
  - Total: 592
- Sex ratio 309/283♂/♀

Languages
  - Official: Punjabi
  - Other spoken: Hindi
- Time zone: UTC+5:30 (IST)
- PIN: 144601
- Telephone code: 01822
- ISO 3166 code: IN-PB
- Vehicle registration: PB-09
- Website: kapurthala.gov.in

Dham is a village in Kapurthala district of Punjab State, India. It is located 7 kilometres (4.3 mi) from Kapurthala, which is both district and sub-district headquarters of Dham. The village is administrated by a Sarpanch, who is an elected representative.

== Demography ==
According to the report published by Census India in 2011, Dham has a total number of 110 houses and population of 592 of which include 309 males and 283 females. Literacy rate of Dham is 80.34%, higher than state average of 75.84%. The population of children under the age of 6 years is 58 which is 9.80% of total population of Dham, and child sex ratio is approximately 1000, higher than state average of 846.

== Caste ==
The village has schedule caste (SC) constitutes 37.33% of total population of the village and it doesn't have any Schedule Tribe (ST) population,

== Population data ==
Particulars	Total	Male	Female
Total No. of Houses	110	-	-
Population	592	309	283
Child (0-6)	58	29	29
Schedule Caste	221	122	99
Schedule Tribe	0	0	0
Literacy	80.34 %	82.86 %	77.56 %
Total Workers	90	40	50
Main Worker	75	0	0
Marginal Worker	15	9	6

== Air travel connectivity ==
The closest airport to the village is Sri Guru Ram Dass Jee International Airport.
