= Dewlanwala =

- Village
- Location in Punjab, India Dewlanwala (India)
- Coordinates: 31.371405°N 75.320811°E
- Country: India
- State: Punjab
- District: Kapurthala

Government
  - Type: Panchayati raj (India)
  - Body: Gram panchayat

Population (2011)
  - Total: 932
- Sex ratio 497/435♂/♀

Languages
  - Official: Punjabi
  - Other spoken: Hindi
- Time zone: UTC+5:30 (IST)
- PIN: 144601
- Telephone code: 01822
- ISO 3166 code: IN-PB
- Vehicle registration: PB-09
- Website: kapurthala.gov.in

Dewlanwala is a village in Kapurthala district of Punjab State, India. It is located 6 kilometres (3.7 mi) from Kapurthala, the district and sub-district headquarters. The village is administrated by a Sarpanch, an elected representative.

== Demography ==
Per the report published by Census India in 2011, Dewlanwala has a population of 932 across 194 houses, including 497 males and 435 females. The Literacy rate of Dewlanwala is 68.81%, lower than the state average of 75.84%. Children under the age of 6 years number 108, which is 11.59% of the total population of Dewlanwala, and the child sex ratio is approximately 800, lower than the state average of 846.

== Caste ==
The village's Scheduled Caste (SC) population constitutes 54.18% of the total, and there is no Scheduled Tribe (ST) population.

== Population data ==
Particulars	Total	Male	Female
Total No. of Houses	194	-	-
Population	932	497	435
Child (0-6)	108	60	48
Schedule Caste	505	264	241
Schedule Tribe	0	0	0
Literacy	68.81%	70.94%	66.41%
Total Workers	346	296	50
Main Worker	288	0	0
Marginal Worker	58	22	36

== Air travel connectivity ==
The closest airport to the village is Sri Guru Ram Dass Jee International Airport.
