= Jag, Kapurthala =

Jag
- Village
- Location in Punjab, India Jag (India)
- Coordinates: 31.518934°N 75.424276°E
- Country: India
- State: Punjab
- District: Kapurthala

Government
  - Type: Panchayati raj (India)
  - Body: Gram panchayat

Population (2011)
  - Total: 412
- Sex ratio 222/190♂/♀

Languages
  - Official: Punjabi
  - Other spoken: Hindi
- Time zone: UTC+5:30 (IST)
- PIN: 144802
- Telephone code: 01822
- ISO 3166 code: IN-PB
- Vehicle registration: PB-09
- Website: kapurthala.gov.in

Jag is a village in Kapurthala district of Punjab State, India. It is located 16 kilometres (9.9 mi) from Kapurthala, which is both district and sub-district headquarters of Jag. The village is administrated by a Sarpanch who is an elected representative of village as per the constitution of India and Panchayati raj (India).

== Demography ==
According to the report published by Census India in 2011, Jag has 78 houses with the total population of 412 persons of which 222 are male and 190 females. Literacy rate of Jag is 86.72%, higher than the state average of 75.84%. The population of children in the age group 0–6 years is 43 which is 10.44% of the total population. Child sex ratio is approximately 1048, higher than the state average of 846.

== Population data ==
| Particulars | Total | Male | Female |
|---|---|---|---|
| Total No. of Houses | 78 | - | - |
| Population | 412 | 222 | 190 |
| Child (0-6) | 43 | 21 | 22 |
| Schedule Caste | 162 | 86 | 76 |
| Schedule Tribe | 0 | 0 | 0 |
| Literacy | 86.72 % | 88.06 % | 85.12 % |
| Total Workers | 199 | 148 | 51 |
| Main Worker | 164 | 0 | 0 |
| Marginal Worker | 35 | 13 | 22 |
