= Kadrabad, Kapurthala =

Kadrabad
- Village
- Location in Punjab, India Kadrabad (India)
- Coordinates: 31.292169°N 75.421362°E
- Country: India
- State: Punjab
- District: Kapurthala

Government
  - Type: Panchayati raj (India)
  - Body: Gram panchayat

Population (2011)
  - Total: 483
- Sex ratio 233/250♂/♀

Languages
  - Official: Punjabi
  - Other spoken: Hindi
- Time zone: UTC+5:30 (IST)
- PIN: 144601
- Telephone code: 01822
- ISO 3166 code: IN-PB
- Vehicle registration: PB-09
- Website: kapurthala.gov.in

Kadrabad is a village in Kapurthala district of Punjab State, India. It is located 10 kilometres (6.2 mi) from Kapurthala, which is both district and sub-district headquarters of Kadrabad. The village is administrated by a Sarpanch who is an elected representative of village as per the constitution of India and Panchayati raj (India).

== Demography ==
According to the report published by Census India in 2011, Kadrabad had 88 houses and a population of 483 (233 males and 250 females). The literacy rate was 65.58%, lower than state average of 75.84%. The number of children under the age of 6 years was 53 (10.97% of the population) and the child sex ratio was approximately 893, higher than the state average of 846.

== Population data ==
Particulars	Total	Male	Female
Total no. of houses	88	-	-
Total population	483	233	250
In the age group 0–6 years	53	28	25
Scheduled castes (SC)	295	144	151
Scheduled tribes (ST)	0	0	0
Literate	282	140	142
Illiterate	201	93	108
Total workers	175	125	50
Main workers	101	87	14
Marginal workers	74	38	36

== Air travel connectivity ==
The closest airport to the village is Sri Guru Ram Dass Jee International Airport.

== See also ==
List of villages in Kapurthala
