= Narket =

- Village
- Location in Punjab, India Narket (India)
- Coordinates: 31.430165°N 75.297485°E
- Country: India
- State: Punjab
- District: Kapurthala

Government
  - Type: Panchayati raj (India)
  - Body: Gram panchayat

Population (2011)
  - Total: 398
- Sex ratio 205/193♂/♀

Languages
  - Official: Punjabi
  - Other spoken: Hindi
- Time zone: UTC+5:30 (IST)
- PIN: 144601
- Telephone code: 01822
- ISO 3166 code: IN-PB
- Vehicle registration: PB-09
- Website: kapurthala.gov.in

Narket is a village in Kapurthala district of Punjab State, India. It is located 12 kilometres (7.5 mi) from Kapurthala, which is both district and sub-district headquarters of Narket. The village is administrated by a Sarpanch, who is an elected representative.

== Demography ==
According to the report published by Census India in 2011, Narket has 68 houses with the total population of 398 persons of which 205 are male and 193 females. Literacy rate of Narket is 76.57%, higher than the state average of 75.84%. The population of children in the age group 0–6 years is 48 which is 12.06% of the total population. Child sex ratio is approximately 920, higher than the state average of 846.

== Population data ==
Particulars	Total	Male	Female
Total No. of Houses	68	-	-
Population	398	205	193
Child (0-6)	48	25	23
Schedule Caste	135	72	63
Schedule Tribe	0	0	0
Literacy	76.57 %	81.11 %	71.76 %
Total Workers	137	107	30
Main Worker	133	0	0
Marginal Worker	4	1	3

== Nearby villages ==
- Khangah
- Majorwala
- Khukhrain
- Gaunswala
- Rajpur
- Alaudinpur
- Ghug
- Tayabpur
- Chak Gajiwal
- Jahangirpur
- Khiranwali
