= Kokalpur =

- Village
- Location in Punjab, India Kokalpur (India)
- Coordinates: 31.411739°N 75.361569°E
- Country: India
- State: Punjab
- District: Kapurthala

Government
  - Type: Panchayati raj (India)
  - Body: Gram panchayat

Population (2011)
  - Total: 1,377
- Sex ratio 722/655♂/♀

Languages
  - Official: Punjabi
  - Other spoken: Hindi
- Time zone: UTC+5:30 (IST)
- PIN: 144601
- Telephone code: 01822
- ISO 3166 code: IN-PB
- Vehicle registration: PB-09
- Website: kapurthala.gov.in

Kokalpur is a village in Kapurthala district of Punjab State, India. It is located 2 kilometres (1.2 mi) from Kapurthala, which is both district and sub-district headquarters of Kokalpur. The village is administrated by a Sarpanch Named Navdeep Singh, who is an elected representative.

== Demography ==
According to the report published by Census India in 2011, Kokalpur has total number of 258 houses and population of 1,377 of which include 722 males and 655 females. Literacy rate of Kokalpur is 70.44%, lower than state average of 75.84%. The population of children under the age of 6 years is 115 which is 8.35% of total population of Kokalpur, and child sex ratio is approximately 797, lower than state average of 846.

== Population data ==
Particulars	Total	Male	Female
Total No. of Houses	258	-	-
Total Population	1,377	722	655
In the age group 0–6 years	115	64	51
Scheduled Castes (SC)	581	302	279
Scheduled Tribes (ST)	0	0	0
Literates	889	489	400
Illiterate	488	233	255
Total Worker	422	398	24
Main Worker	316	300	16
Marginal Worker	106	98	8

== Air travel connectivity ==
The closest airport to the village is Sri Guru Ram Dass Jee International Airport.
