= Mugal Chak =

- Village
- Location in Punjab, India Mugal Chak (India)
- Coordinates: 31.395465°N 74.892377°E
- Country: India
- State: Punjab
- District: Kapurthala

Government
  - Type: Panchayati raj (India)
  - Body: Gram panchayat

Population (2011)
  - Total: 505
- Sex ratio 276/229♂/♀

Languages
  - Official: Punjabi
  - Other spoken: Hindi
- Time zone: UTC+5:30 (IST)
- PIN: 144624
- Telephone code: 01822
- ISO 3166 code: IN-PB
- Vehicle registration: PB-09
- Website: kapurthala.gov.in

Mugal Chak is a village in Kapurthala district of Punjab State, India. It is located 25 kilometres (16 mi) from Kapurthala, which is both district and sub-district headquarters of Mugal Chak. The village is administrated by a Sarpanch who is an elected representative of village as per the constitution of India and Panchayati raj (India).

== Demography ==
According to the report published by Census India in 2011, Mugal Chak has total number of 96 houses and population of 505 of which include 276 males and 229 females. Literacy rate of Mugal Chak is 79.57%, higher than state average of 75.84%. The population of children under the age of 6 years is 45 which is 8.91% of total population of Mugal Chak, and child sex ratio is approximately 607, lower than state average of 846.

== Population data ==
Particulars	Total	Male	Female
Total No. of Houses	96	-	-
Population	505	276	229
Child (0-6)	45	28	17
Schedule Caste	161	87	74
Schedule Tribe	0	0	0
Literacy	79.57 %	87.10 %	70.75 %
Total Workers	159	152	7
Main Worker	153	0	0
Marginal Worker	6	5	1

== Air travel connectivity ==
The closest airport to the village is Sri Guru Ram Dass Jee International Airport.
