= Balehar Khanpur =

- Village
- Location in Punjab, India Balehar Khanpur (India)
- Coordinates: 31.298437°N 75.427189°E
- Country: India
- State: Punjab
- District: Kapurthala

Government
  - Type: Panchayati raj (India)
  - Body: Gram panchayat

Population (2011)
  - Total: 726
- Sex ratio 375/351♂/♀

Languages
  - Official: Punjabi
  - Other spoken: Hindi
- Time zone: UTC+5:30 (IST)
- PIN: 144601
- Telephone code: 01822
- ISO 3166 code: IN-PB
- Vehicle registration: PB-09
- Website: kapurthala.gov.in

Balehar Khanpur is a village in Kapurthala district of Punjab State, India. It is located 8 kilometres (5.0 mi) from Kapurthala, which is both district and sub-district headquarters of Balehar Khanpur. The village is administrated by a Sarpanch, who is an elected representative.

== Demography ==
According to the report published by Census India in 2011, Balehar Khanpur has a total number of 146 houses and population of 726 of which include 375 males and 351 females. Literacy rate of Balehar Khanpur is 76.57%, higher than state average of 75.84%. The population of children under the age of 6 years is 73 which is 10.06% of total population of Balehar Khanpur, and child sex ratio is approximately 622 lower than state average of 846.

== Population data ==
Particulars	Total	Male	Female
Total No. of Houses	146	-	-
Population	726	375	351
Child (0–6)	73	45	28
Schedule Caste	174	89	85
Schedule Tribe	0	0	0
Literacy	76.57 %	83.94 %	69.04 %
Total Workers	209	197	12
Main Worker	200	0	0
Marginal Worker	9	8	1

== Air travel connectivity ==
The closest airport to the village is Sri Guru Ram Dass Jee International Airport.
