= Budhuwala =

- Village
- Location in Punjab, India Budhuwala (India)
- Coordinates: 31.447062°N 75.310606°E
- Country: India
- State: Punjab
- District: Kapurthala

Government
  - Type: Panchayati raj (India)
  - Body: Gram panchayat

Population (2011)
  - Total: 207
- Sex ratio 101/106♂/♀

Languages
  - Official: Punjabi
  - Other spoken: Hindi
- Time zone: UTC+5:30 (IST)
- PIN: 144601
- Telephone code: 01822
- ISO 3166 code: IN-PB
- Vehicle registration: PB-09
- Website: kapurthala.gov.in

Budhuwala is a village in Kapurthala district of Punjab State, India. It is located 9 kilometres (5.6 mi) from Kapurthala, which is both district and sub-district headquarters of Budhuwala. The village is administrated by a Sarpanch who is an elected representative of village as per the constitution of India and Panchayati raj (India).

== Demography ==
According to the report published by Census India in 2011, Budhuwala has a total number of 32 houses and population of 207 of which include 101 males and 106 females. Literacy rate of Budhuwala is 82.35%, higher than state average of 75.84%. The population of children under the age of 6 years is 20 which is 9.66% of total population of Budhuwala, and child sex ratio is approximately 1000, higher than state average of 846.

== Population data ==
Particulars	Total	Male	Female
Total No. of Houses	32	-	-
Population	207	101	106
Child (0–6)	20	10	10
Schedule Caste	44	23	21
Schedule Tribe	0	0	0
Literacy	82.35 %	82.42 %	82.29 %
Total Workers	66	55	11
Main Worker	63	0	0
Marginal Worker	3	3	0

== Air travel connectivity ==
The closest airport to the village is Sri Guru Ram Dass Jee International Airport.
