= Mithra, Kapurthala =

Mithra
- Village
- Location in Punjab, India Mithra (India)
- Coordinates: 31.120820°N 75.649903°E
- Country: India
- State: Punjab
- District: Kapurthala

Government
  - Type: Panchayati raj (India)
  - Body: Gram panchayat

Population (2011)
  - Total: 350
- Sex ratio 185/165♂/♀

Languages
  - Official: Punjabi
  - Other spoken: Hindi
- Time zone: UTC+5:30 (IST)
- PIN: 144620
- Telephone code: 01822
- ISO 3166 code: IN-PB
- Vehicle registration: PB-09
- Website: kapurthala.gov.in

Mithra is a village in Kapurthala district of Punjab State, India. It is located 15 kilometres (9.3 mi) from Kapurthala, which is both district and sub-district headquarters of Mithra. The village is administrated by a Sarpanch who is an elected representative of village as per the constitution of India and Panchayati raj (India).

== Demography ==
According to the report published by Census India in 2011, Mithra has total number of 80 houses and population of 350 of which include 185 males and 165 females. Literacy rate of Mithra is 71.88%, lower than state average of 75.84%. The population of children under the age of 6 years is 30 which is 8.57% of total population of Mithra, and child sex ratio is approximately 875, higher than state average of 846.

== Population data ==
Particulars	Total	Male	Female
Total No. of Houses	80	-	-
Population	350	185	165
Child (0-6)	30	16	14
Schedule Caste	64	32	32
Schedule Tribe	0	0	0
Literacy	71.88 %	76.33 %	66.89 %
Total Workers	134	107	27
Main Worker	134	0	0
Marginal Worker	0	0	0

== Air travel connectivity ==
The closest airport to the village is Sri Guru Ram Dass Jee International Airport.
