= Badshahpur, Kapurthala =

Badshahpur
- Village
- Location in Punjab, India Badshahpur (India)
- Coordinates: 31.238312°N 75.379110°E
- Country: India
- State: Punjab
- District: Kapurthala

Government
  - Type: Panchayati raj (India)
  - Body: Gram panchayat

Population (2011)
  - Total: 817
- Sex ratio 419/398♂/♀

Languages
  - Official: Punjabi
  - Other spoken: Hindi
- Time zone: UTC+5:30 (IST)
- PIN: 144601
- Telephone code: 01822
- ISO 3166 code: IN-PB
- Vehicle registration: PB-09
- Website: kapurthala.gov.in

Badshahpur is a village in Kapurthala district of Punjab State, India. It is located 8 kilometres (5.0 mi) from Kapurthala, which is both district and sub-district headquarters of Badshahpur. The village is administrated by a Sarpanch, who is an elected representative.

== Demography ==
According to the report published by Census India in 2011, Badshahpur has a total number of 145 houses and population of 817 of which include 419 males and 398 females. Literacy rate of Badshahpur is 69.71%, lower than state average of 75.84%. The population of children under the age of 6 years is 104 which is 12.73% of total population of Badshahpur, and child sex ratio is approximately 1167 higher than state average of 846.

== Population data ==
Particulars	Total	Male	Female
Total No. of Houses	145	-	-
Population	817	419	398
Child (0–6)	104	48	56
Schedule Caste	618	307	311
Schedule Tribe	0	0	0
Literacy	69.71 %	76.55 %	62.28 %
Total Workers	397	262	135
Main Worker	260	0	0
Marginal Worker	137	40	97

== Air travel connectivity ==
The closest airport to the village is Sri Guru Ram Dass Jee International Airport.
