= Tayabpur =

- Village
- Location in Punjab, India Tayabpur (India)
- Coordinates: 31.396494°N 75.314251°E
- Country: India
- State: Punjab
- District: Kapurthala

Government
  - Type: Panchayati raj (India)
  - Body: Gram panchayat

Population (2011)
  - Total: 464
- Sex ratio 258/206♂/♀

Languages
  - Official: Punjabi
  - Other spoken: Hindi
- Time zone: UTC+5:30 (IST)
- PIN: 144601
- Telephone code: 01822
- ISO 3166 code: IN-PB
- Vehicle registration: PB-09
- Website: kapurthala.gov.in

Tayabpur is a village in Kapurthala district of Punjab State, India. It is located 8 kilometres (5.0 mi) from Kapurthala, which is both district and sub-district headquarters of Tayabpur. The village is administrated by a Sarpanch, who is an elected representative.

== Demography ==
According to the report published by Census India in 2011, Tayabpur has total number of 96 houses and population of 464 of which include 258 males and 206 females. Literacy rate of Tayabpur is 77.46%, higher than state average of 75.84%. The population of children under the age of 6 years is 47 which is 10.13% of total population of Tayabpur, and child sex ratio is approximately 880, higher than state average of 846.

== Population data ==
Particulars	Total	Male	Female
Total No. of Houses	96	-	-
Total Population	464	258	206
In the age group 0–6 years	47	25	22
Scheduled Castes (SC)	355	203	152
Scheduled Tribes (ST)	0	0	0
Literates	323	193	130
Illiterate	141	65	76
Total Worker	181	164	17
Main Worker	176	160	16
Marginal Worker	5	4	1

== Air travel connectivity ==
The closest airport to the village is Sri Guru Ram Dass Jee International Airport.
