= Fazlabad, Kapurthala =

Fazlabad
- Village
- Location in Punjab, India Fazlabad (India)
- Coordinates: 31.408629°N 75.256656°E
- Country: India
- State: Punjab
- District: Kapurthala

Government
  - Type: Panchayati raj (India)
  - Body: Gram panchayat

Population (2011)
  - Total: 735
- Sex ratio 397/338♂/♀

Languages
  - Official: Punjabi
  - Other spoken: Hindi
- Time zone: UTC+5:30 (IST)
- PIN: 144804
- Telephone code: 01822
- ISO 3166 code: IN-PB
- Vehicle registration: PB-09
- Website: kapurthala.gov.in

Fazlabad is a village in Kapurthala district of Punjab State, India. It is located 17 kilometres (11 mi) from Kapurthala, which is both district and sub-district headquarters of Fazlabad. The village is administrated by a Sarpanch, who is an elected representative.

== Demography ==
According to the report published by Census India in 2011, Fazlabad has a total number of 134 houses and population of 735 of which include 397 males and 338 females. Literacy rate of Fazlabad is 83.21%, higher than state average of 75.84%. The population of children under the age of 6 years is 74 which is 10.07% of total population of Fazlabad, and child sex ratio is approximately 721, lower than state average of 846.

== Population data ==
Particulars	Total	Male	Female
Total No. of Houses	134	-	-
Population	735	397	338
Child (0-6)	74	43	31
Schedule Caste	690	373	317
Schedule Tribe	0	0	0
Literacy	83.21 %	87.01 %	78.83 %
Total Workers	223	212	11
Main Worker	222	0	0
Marginal Worker	1	0	1

== Air travel connectivity ==
The closest airport to the village is Sri Guru Ram Dass Jee International Airport.
