= Gopipur, Kapurthala =

Gopipur
- Village
- Location in Punjab, India Gopipur (India)
- Coordinates: 31.364663°N 75.298943°E
- Country: India
- State: Punjab
- District: Kapurthala

Government
  - Type: Panchayati raj (India)
  - Body: Gram panchayat

Population (2011)
  - Total: 1,075
- Sex ratio 600/475♂/♀

Languages
  - Official: Punjabi
  - Other spoken: Hindi
- Time zone: UTC+5:30 (IST)
- PIN: 144628
- Telephone code: 01822
- ISO 3166 code: IN-PB
- Vehicle registration: PB-09
- Website: kapurthala.gov.in

Gopipur is a village in Kapurthala district of Punjab State, India. It is located 10 kilometres (6.2 mi) from Kapurthala, which is both district and sub-district headquarters of Gopipur. The village is administrated by a Sarpanch, who is an elected representative.

== Demography ==
According to the report published by Census India in 2011, Gopipur has total number of 199 houses and population of 1,075 of which include 600 males and 475 females. Literacy rate of Gopipur is 77.65%, higher than state average of 75.84%. The population of children under the age of 6 years is 86 which is 8.00% of total population of Gopipur, and child sex ratio is approximately 593, lower than state average of 846.

== Population data ==
Particulars	Total	Male	Female
Total No. of Houses	199	-	-
Population	1,075	600	475
Child (0-6)	86	54	32
Schedule Caste	195	112	83
Schedule Tribe	0	0	0
Literacy	77.65 %	84.43 %	69.30 %
Total Workers	378	355	23
Main Worker	371	0	0
Marginal Worker	7	0	7

== Air travel connectivity ==
The closest airport to the village is Sri Guru Ram Dass Jee International Airport.
