= Seenpur =

- Village
- Location in Punjab, India Seenpur (India)
- Coordinates: 31.396979°N 75.396595°E
- Country: India
- State: Punjab
- District: Kapurthala

Government
  - Type: Panchayati raj (India)
  - Body: Gram panchayat

Population (2011)
  - Total: 855
- Sex ratio 440/415♂/♀

Languages
  - Official: Punjabi
  - Other spoken: Hindi
- Time zone: UTC+5:30 (IST)
- PIN: 144601
- Telephone code: 01822
- ISO 3166 code: IN-PB
- Vehicle registration: PB-09
- Website: kapurthala.gov.in

Seenpur is a village in Kapurthala district of Punjab State, India. It is located 1.5 kilometres (0.93 mi) from Kapurthala, which is both district and sub-district headquarters of Seenpur. The village is administrated by a Sarpanch, who is an elected representative.

== Demography ==
According to the report published by Census India in 2011, Seenpur has total number of 154 houses and population of 855 of which include 440 males and 415 females. Literacy rate of Seenpur is 71.92%, lower than state average of 75.84%. The population of children under the age of 6 years is 93 which is 10.88% of total population of Seenpur, and child sex ratio is approximately 1325, higher than state average of 846.

== Population data ==
Particulars	Total	Male	Female
Total No. of Houses	154	-	-
Total Population	855	440	415
In the age group 0–6 years	93	40	53
Scheduled Castes (SC)	523	266	257
Scheduled Tribes (ST)	0	0	0
Literates	548	308	240
Illiterate	307	132	175
Total Worker	289	257	32
Main Worker	249	229	20
Marginal Worker	40	28	12

== Air travel connectivity ==
The closest airport to the village is Sri Guru Ram Dass Jee International Airport.
