= Balehar Kalan =

- Village
- Location in Punjab, India Balehar Kalan (India)
- Country: India
- State: Punjab
- District: Kapurthala

Government
  - Type: Panchayati raj (India)
  - Body: Gram panchayat

Population (2011)
  - Total: 647
- Sex ratio 346/301♂/♀

Languages
  - Official: Punjabi
  - Other spoken: Hindi
- Time zone: UTC+5:30 (IST)
- PIN: 144601
- Telephone code: 01822
- ISO 3166 code: IN-PB
- Vehicle registration: PB-09
- Website: kapurthala.gov.in

Balehar Kalan is a village in Kapurthala district of Punjab State, India. Kalan is Persian language word which means Big.It is located 8 kilometres (5.0 mi) from Kapurthala, which is both district and sub-district headquarters of Balehar Kalan. The village is administrated by a Sarpanch, who is an elected representative.

== Demography ==
According to the report published by Census India in 2011, Balehar Kalan has a total number of 129 houses and population of 647 of which include 346 males and 301 females. Literacy rate of Balehar Kalan is 66.36%, lower than state average of 75.84%. The population of children under the age of 6 years is 58 which is 8.96% of total population of Balehar Kalan, and child sex ratio is approximately 706, lower than state average of 846.

== Population data ==
Particulars	Total	Male	Female
Total No. of Houses	129	-	-
Population	647	346	301
Child (0-6)	58	34	24
Schedule Caste	209	115	94
Schedule Tribe	0	0	0
Literacy	84.72 %	87.82 %	81.23 %
Total Workers	178	167	11
Main Worker	177	0	0
Marginal Worker	1	1	0

== Air travel connectivity ==
The closest airport to the village is Sri Guru Ram Dass Jee International Airport.
