= Gaunswala =

- Village
- Location in Punjab, India Gaunswala (India)
- Coordinates: 31.436567°N 75.316437°E
- Country: India
- State: Punjab
- District: Kapurthala

Government
  - Type: Panchayati raj (India)
  - Body: Gram panchayat

Population (2011)
  - Total: 32
- Sex ratio 13/19♂/♀

Languages
  - Official: Punjabi
  - Other spoken: Hindi
- Time zone: UTC+5:30 (IST)
- PIN: 144601
- Telephone code: 01822
- ISO 3166 code: IN-PB
- Vehicle registration: PB-09
- Website: kapurthala.gov.in

Gaunswala is a village in Kapurthala district of Punjab State, India. It is located 9 kilometres (5.6 mi) from Kapurthala, which is both district and sub-district headquarters of Gaunswala. The village is administrated by a Sarpanch, who is an elected representative.

== Demography ==
According to the report published by Census India in 2011, Gaunswala has a total number of 7 houses and population of 32 of which include 13 males and 19 females. Literacy rate of Gaunswala is 80.00%, higher than state average of 75.84%. The population of children under the age of 6 years is 7 which is 21.88% of total population of Gaunswala, and child sex ratio is approximately 2500, higher than state average of 846.

== Population data ==
Particulars	Total	Male	Female
Total No. of Houses	7	-	-
Population	32	13	19
Child (0-6)	7	2	5
Schedule Caste	0	0	0
Schedule Tribe	0	0	0
Literacy	80.00 %	72.73 %	85.71 %
Total Workers	8	8	0
Main Worker	8	0	0
Marginal Worker	0	0	0

== Air travel connectivity ==
The closest airport to the village is Sri Guru Ram Dass Jee International Airport.
