= Bhooi =

- Village
- Location in Punjab, India Bhooi (India)
- Coordinates: 31.347514°N 75.355793°E
- Country: India
- State: Punjab
- District: Kapurthala

Government
  - Type: Panchayati raj (India)
  - Body: Gram panchayat

Population (2011)
  - Total: 1,178
- Sex ratio 613/565♂/♀

Languages
  - Official: Punjabi
  - Other spoken: Hindi
- Time zone: UTC+5:30 (IST)
- PIN: 144620
- Telephone code: 01822
- ISO 3166 code: IN-PB
- Vehicle registration: PB-09
- Website: kapurthala.gov.in

Bhooi is a village in Kapurthala district of Punjab State, India. It is located 3 kilometres (1.9 mi) from Kapurthala, which is both district and sub-district headquarters of Bhooi. The village is administrated by a Sarpanch, who is an elected representative.

== Demography ==
According to the report published by Census India in 2011, Bhooi has a total number of 242 houses and population of 1,178 of which include 613 males and 565 females. Literacy rate of Bhooi is 77.98%, higher than state average of 75.84%. The population of children under the age of 6 years is 138 which is 11.71% of total population of Bhooi, and child sex ratio is approximately 1190, higher than state average of 846.

== Population data ==
Particulars	Total	Male	Female
Total No. of Houses	242	-	-
Population	1,178	613	565
Child (0-6)	138	63	75
Schedule Caste	641	333	308
Schedule Tribe	0	0	0
Literacy	77.98 %	84.91 %	70.20 %
Total Workers	466	340	126
Main Worker	297	0	0
Marginal Worker	169	80	89

== Air travel connectivity ==
The closest airport to the village is Sri Guru Ram Dass Jee International Airport.
