= Khera Bet =

- Village
- Location in Punjab, India Khera Bet (India)
- Coordinates: 31.405696°N 75.243531°E
- Country: India
- State: Punjab
- District: Kapurthala

Government
  - Type: Panchayati raj (India)
  - Body: Gram panchayat

Population (2011)
  - Total: 723
- Sex ratio 391/332♂/♀

Languages
  - Official: Punjabi
  - Other spoken: Hindi
- Time zone: UTC+5:30 (IST)
- PIN: 144804
- Telephone code: 01822
- ISO 3166 code: IN-PB
- Vehicle registration: PB-09
- Website: kapurthala.gov.in

Khera Bet is a village in Kapurthala district of Punjab State, India. It is located 12 kilometres (7.5 mi) from Kapurthala, which is both district and sub-district headquarters of Khera Bet. The village is administrated by a Sarpanch, who is an elected representative.

== Demography ==
According to the report published by Census India in 2011, Khera Bet had a total number of 138 houses and population of 723 which included 391 males and 332 females. Literacy rate of Khera Bet is 78.60%, higher than state average of 75.84%. The population of children under the age of 6 years is 64 which is 8.85% of total population of Khera Bet, and child sex ratio is approximately 684, lower than the state average of 846.

== Population data ==
Particulars	Total	Male	Female
Total No. of Houses	138	-	-
Population	723	391	332
Child (0-6)	64	38	26
Schedule Caste	262	139	123
Schedule Tribe	0	0	0
Literacy	78.60 %	82.72 %	73.86 %
Total Workers	246	228	18
Main Worker	147	0	0
Marginal Worker	99	94	5

== Air travel connectivity ==
The closest airport to the village is Sri Guru Ram Dass Jee International Airport.
