= Bhana, Kapurthala =

Bhana
- Village
- Location in Punjab, India Bhana (India)
- Coordinates: 30.666904°N 74.833167°E
- Country: India
- State: Punjab
- District: Kapurthala

Government
  - Type: Panchayati raj (India)
  - Body: Gram panchayat

Population (2011)
  - Total: 58
- Sex ratio 29/29♂/♀

Languages
  - Official: Punjabi
  - Other spoken: Hindi
- Time zone: UTC+5:30 (IST)
- PIN: 144625
- Telephone code: 01822
- ISO 3166 code: IN-PB
- Vehicle registration: PB-09
- Website: kapurthala.gov.in

Bhana is a village in Kapurthala district of Punjab State, India. It is located 13 kilometres (8.1 mi) from Kapurthala, which is both district and sub-district headquarters of Bhana. The village is administrated by a Sarpanch, who is an elected representative.

== Demography ==
According to the report published by Census India in 2011, Bhana has a total number of 12 houses and population of 58 of which include 29 males and 29 females. Literacy rate of Bhana is 74.51%, lower than state average of 75.84%. The population of children under the age of 6 years is 7 which is 12.07% of total population of Bhana, and child sex ratio is approximately 1333, higher than state average of 846.

== Population data ==
Particulars	Total	Male	Female
Total No. of Houses	12	-	-
Population	58	29	29
Child (0–6)	7	3	4
Schedule Caste	0	0	0
Schedule Tribe	0	0	0
Literacy	74.51 %	80.77 %	68.00 %
Total Workers	29	22	7
Main Worker	15	0	0
Marginal Worker	14	8	6

== Air travel connectivity ==
The closest airport to the village is Sri Guru Ram Dass Jee International Airport.
