= Khojewali =

- Village
- Location in Punjab, India Khojewali (India)
- Coordinates: 31.359418°N 75.469213°E
- Country: India
- State: Punjab
- District: Kapurthala

Government
  - Type: Panchayati raj (India)
  - Body: Gram panchayat

Population (2011)
  - Total: 1,308
- Sex ratio 685/623♂/♀

Languages
  - Official: Punjabi
  - Other spoken: Hindi
- Time zone: UTC+5:30 (IST)
- PIN: 144601
- Telephone code: 01822
- ISO 3166 code: IN-PB
- Vehicle registration: PB-09
- Website: kapurthala.gov.in

Khojewali is a village in Kapurthala district of Punjab State, India. It is located 10 kilometres (6.2 mi) from Kapurthala, which is both district and sub-district headquarters of Khojewali. The village is administrated by a Sarpanch, who is an elected representative.

== Demography ==
According to the report published by Census India in 2011, Khojewali has total number of 258 houses and population of 1,308 of which include 685 males and 623 females. Literacy rate of Khojewali is 84.40%, higher than state average of 75.84%. The population of children under the age of 6 years is 135 which is 10.32% of total population of Khojewali, and child sex ratio is approximately 1077, higher than state average of 846.

== Population data ==
Particulars	Total	Male	Female
Total No. of Houses	258	-	-
Population	1,308	685	623
Child (0-6)	135	65	70
Schedule Caste	589	310	279
Schedule Tribe	0	0	0
Literacy	84.40 %	88.87 %	79.39 %
Total Workers	425	400	25
Main Worker	401	0	0
Marginal Worker	24	19	5

== Air travel connectivity ==
The closest airport to the village is Sri Guru Ram Dass Jee International Airport.
