= Lodhi Bholana =

- Village
- Location in Punjab, India Lodhi Bholana (India)
- Coordinates: 31.315611°N 75.333930°E
- Country: India
- State: Punjab
- District: Kapurthala

Government
  - Type: Panchayati raj (India)
  - Body: Gram panchayat

Population (2011)
  - Total: 1,130
- Sex ratio 594/536♂/♀

Languages
  - Official: Punjabi
  - Other spoken: Hindi
- Time zone: UTC+5:30 (IST)
- PIN: 144602
- Telephone code: 01822
- ISO 3166 code: IN-PB
- Vehicle registration: PB-09
- Website: kapurthala.gov.in

Lodhi Bholana is a village in Kapurthala district of Punjab State, India. It is located 9 kilometres (5.6 mi) from Kapurthala, which is both district and sub-district headquarters of Lodhi Bholana. The village is administrated by a Sarpanch who is an elected representative of village as per the constitution of India and Panchayati raj (India).

== Demography ==
According to the report published by Census India in 2011, Lodhi Bholana has 212 houses with the total population of 1,130 persons of which 594 are male and 536 females. Literacy rate of Lodhi Bholana is 75.20%, lower than the state average of 75.84%. The population of children in the age group 0–6 years is 154 which is 13.63% of the total population. Child sex ratio is approximately 812, lower than the state average of 846.

== Population data ==
Particulars	Total	Male	Female
Total No. of Houses	212	-	-
Population	1,130	594	536
Child (0-6)	154	85	69
Schedule Caste	680	353	327
Schedule Tribe	0	0	0
Literacy	75.20 %	78.39 %	71.73 %
Total Workers	431	335	96
Main Worker	428	0	0
Marginal Worker	3	2	1
