= Rasulpur Chisty =

- Village
- Location in Punjab, India Rasulpur Chisty (India)
- Coordinates: 31.326459°N 75.331015°E
- Country: India
- State: Punjab
- District: Kapurthala

Government
  - Type: Panchayati raj (India)
  - Body: Gram panchayat

Population (2011)
  - Total: 819
- Sex ratio 436/383♂/♀

Languages
  - Official: Punjabi
  - Other spoken: Hindi
- Time zone: UTC+5:30 (IST)
- PIN: 144602
- Telephone code: 01822
- ISO 3166 code: IN-PB
- Vehicle registration: PB-09
- Website: kapurthala.gov.in

Rasulpur Chisty is a village in Kapurthala district of Punjab State, India. It is located 9 kilometres (5.6 mi) from Kapurthala, which is both district and sub-district headquarters of Rasulpur Chisty. The village is administrated by a Sarpanch who is an elected representative of village as per the constitution of India and Panchayati raj (India).

== Demography ==
According to the report published by Census India in 2011, Rasulpur Chisty has 183 houses with the total population of 819 persons of which 436 are male and 383 females. Literacy rate of Rasulpur Chisty is 89.01%, higher than the state average of 75.84%. The population of children in the age group 0–6 years is 91 which is 11.11% of the total population. Child sex ratio is approximately 750, lower than the state average of 846.

== Population data ==
Particulars	Total	Male	Female
Total No. of Houses	183	-	-
Population	819	436	383
Child (0-6)	91	52	39
Schedule Caste	92	52	40
Schedule Tribe	0	0	0
Literacy	89.01 %	92.45 %	85.17 %
Total Workers	255	220	35
Main Worker	231	0	0
Marginal Worker	24	21	3
