= Dhak Bhulla Rai =

- Village
- Location in Punjab, India Dhak Bhulla Rai (India)
- Coordinates: 31.234041°N 75.778070°E
- Country: India
- State: Punjab
- District: Kapurthala

Government
  - Type: Panchayati raj (India)
  - Body: Gram panchayat

Population (2011)
  - Total: 367
- Sex ratio 199/168♂/♀

Languages
  - Official: Punjabi
  - Other spoken: Hindi
- Time zone: UTC+5:30 (IST)
- PIN: 144401
- Telephone code: 01822
- ISO 3166 code: IN-PB
- Vehicle registration: PB-09
- Website: kapurthala.gov.in

Dhak Bhulla Rai is a village in Phagwara Tehsil in Kapurthala district of Punjab State, India. It is located 43 kilometres (27 mi) from Kapurthala, 5 kilometres (3.1 mi) from Phagwara. The village is administrated by a Sarpanch, who is an elected representative.

== Demography ==
According to the report published by Census India in 2011, Dhak Bhulla Rai has 80 houses with the total population of 367 persons of which 199 are male and 168 females. Literacy rate of Dhak Bhulla Rai is 71.56%, lower than the state average of 75.84%. The population of children in the age group 0–6 years is 47 which is 12.81% of the total population. Child sex ratio is approximately 958, higher than the state average of 846.

== Population data ==
Particulars	Total	Male	Female
Total No. of Houses	80	-	-
Population	367	199	168
Child (0-6)	47	24	23
Schedule Caste	68	35	33
Schedule Tribe	0	0	0
Literacy	71.56 %	75.43 %	66.90 %
Total Workers	124	110	14
Main Worker	109	0	0
Marginal Worker	15	11	4
