= Lakhanke Padde =

- Village
- Location in Punjab, India Lakhanke Padde (India)
- Coordinates: 31.513163°N 75.404608°E
- Country: India
- State: Punjab
- District: Kapurthala

Government
  - Type: Panchayati raj (India)
  - Body: Gram panchayat

Population (2011)
  - Total: 3,830
- Sex ratio 2008/1822♂/♀

Languages
  - Official: Punjabi
  - Other spoken: Hindi
- Time zone: UTC+5:30 (IST)
- PIN: 144802
- Telephone code: 01822
- ISO 3166 code: IN-PB
- Vehicle registration: PB-09
- Website: kapurthala.gov.in

Lakhanke Padde is a village in Kapurthala district of Punjab State, India. It is located 17 kilometres (11 mi) from Kapurthala, which is both district and sub-district headquarters of Lakhanke Padde. The village is administrated by a Sarpanch, who is an elected representative.

== Demography ==
According to the report published by Census India in 2011, Lakhanke Padde has 778 houses with the total population of 3,830 persons of which 2,008 are male and 1,822 females. Literacy rate of Lakhanke Padde is 72.88%, lower than the state average of 75.84%. The population of children in the age group 0–6 years is 360 which is 9.40% of the total population. Child sex ratio is approximately 989, higher than the state average of 846.

== Population data ==
Particulars	Total	Male	Female
Total No. of Houses	778	-	-
Population	3,830	2,008	1,822
Child (0-6)	360	181	179
Schedule Caste	1,347	715	632
Schedule Tribe	0	0	0
Literacy	72.88 %	77.18 %	68.11 %
Total Workers	1,182	1,065	117
Main Worker	1,009	0	0
Marginal Worker	173	130	43
