= Karahal Khurd =

- Village
- Location in Punjab, India Karahal Khurd (India)
- Coordinates: 31.270051°N 75.314980°E
- Country: India
- State: Punjab
- District: Kapurthala

Government
  - Type: Panchayati raj (India)
  - Body: Gram panchayat

Population (2011)
  - Total: 315
- Sex ratio 158/157♂/♀

Sarpanch- Sukhwinder Kaur
  - Official Language: Punjabi
  - Other spoken: Hindi
- Time zone: UTC+5:30 (IST)
- PIN: 144625
- Telephone code: 01822
- ISO 3166 code: IN-PB
- Vehicle registration: PB-09
- Website: kapurthala.gov.in

Karahal Khurd is a village in Kapurthala district of Punjab State, India. Khurd is Persian language word which means small.It is located 17 kilometres (11 mi) from Kapurthala, which is both district and sub-district headquarters of Karahal Khurd. The village is administered by a Sarpanch, who is an elected representative.

== Demography ==
According to the report published by Census India in 2011, Karahal Khurd has 59 houses with the total population of 315 persons of which 158 are male and 157 females. Literacy rate of Karahal Khurd is 74.06%, lower than the state average of 75.84%. The population of children in the age group 0–6 years is 49 which is 15.56% of the total population. Child sex ratio is approximately 1227, higher than the state average of 846.

== Population data ==
Particulars	Total	Male	Female
No. of Houses	59	-	-
Population	315	158	157
Child (0-6)	49	22	27
Schedule Caste	153	78	75
Schedule Tribe	0	0	0
Literacy	74.06 %	76.47 %	71.54 %
Total Workers	86	77	9
Main Worker	77	0	0
Marginal Worker	9	7	2
