= Majahadpur =

- Village
- Location in Punjab, India Majahadpur (India)
- Coordinates: 31.355520°N 75.316437°E
- Country: India
- State: Punjab
- District: Kapurthala

Government
  - Type: Panchayati raj (India)
  - Body: Gram panchayat

Population (2011)
  - Total: 384
- Sex ratio 207/177♂/♀

Languages
  - Official: Punjabi
  - Other spoken: Hindi
- Time zone: UTC+5:30 (IST)
- PIN: 144601
- Telephone code: 01822
- ISO 3166 code: IN-PB
- Vehicle registration: PB-09
- Website: kapurthala.gov.in

Majahadpur is a village in Kapurthala district of Punjab State, India. It is located 9 kilometres (5.6 mi) from Kapurthala, which is both district and sub-district headquarters of Majahadpur. The village is administrated by a Sarpanch who is an elected representative of village as per the constitution of India and Panchayati raj (India).

== Demography ==
According to the report published by Census India in 2011, Majahadpur has 70 houses with the total population of 384 persons of which 207 are male and 177 females. Literacy rate of Majahadpur is 71.59%, lower than the state average of 75.84%. The population of children in the age group 0–6 years is 39 which is 10.16% of the total population. Child sex ratio is approximately 950, higher than the state average of 846.

== Population data ==
Particulars	Total	Male	Female
Total No. of Houses	70	-	-
Total Population	384	207	177
In the age group 0–6 years	39	20	19
Scheduled Castes (SC)	117	62	55
Scheduled Tribes (ST)	0	0	0
Literates	247	141	106
Illiterate	137	66	71
Total Worker	128	116	12
Main Worker	102	97	5
Marginal Worker	26	19	7
