= Sidhpur, Kapurthala =

Sidhpur
- Village
- Location in Punjab, India Sidhpur (India)
- Coordinates: 31.306608°N 75.437386°E
- Country: India
- State: Punjab
- District: Kapurthala

Government
  - Type: Panchayati raj (India)
  - Body: Gram panchayat

Population (2011)
  - Total: 516
- Sex ratio 273/243♂/♀

Languages
  - Official: Punjabi
  - Other spoken: Hindi
- Time zone: UTC+5:30 (IST)
- PIN: 144601
- Telephone code: 01822
- ISO 3166 code: IN-PB
- Vehicle registration: PB-09
- Website: kapurthala.gov.in

Sidhpur is a village in Kapurthala district of Punjab State, India. It is located 12 kilometres (7.5 mi) from Kapurthala, which is both district and sub-district headquarters of Sidhpur. The village is administrated by a Sarpanch who is an elected representative of village as per the constitution of India and Panchayati raj (India).

== Demography ==
According to the report published by Census India in 2011, Sidhpur has 96 houses with the total population of 516 persons of which 273 are male and 243 females. Literacy rate of Sidhpur is 81.08%, higher than the state average of 75.84%. The population of children in the age group 0–6 years is 51 which is 9.88% of the total population. Child sex ratio is approximately 821, lower than the state average of 846.

== Population data ==
Particulars	Total	Male	Female
Total No. of Houses	96	-	-
Population	516	273	243
Child (0-6)	51	28	23
Schedule Caste	103	48	55
Schedule Tribe	0	0	0
Literacy	81.08 %	86.94 %	74.55 %
Total Workers	191	173	18
Main Worker	182	0	0
Marginal Worker	9	4	5
