= Bajola =

- Village
- Location in Punjab, India Bajola (India)
- Coordinates: 31.462697°N 75.384938°E
- Country: India
- State: Punjab
- District: Kapurthala

Government
  - Type: Panchayati raj (India)
  - Body: Gram panchayat

Population (2011)
  - Total: 552
- Sex ratio 287/265♂/♀

Languages
  - Official: Punjabi
  - Other spoken: Hindi
- Time zone: UTC+5:30 (IST)
- PIN: 144601
- Telephone code: 01822
- ISO 3166 code: IN-PB
- Vehicle registration: PB-09
- Website: kapurthala.gov.in

Bajola is a village in Kapurthala district of Punjab State, India. It is located 10 kilometres (6.2 mi) from Kapurthala, which is both district and sub-district headquarters of Bajola. The village is administrated by a Sarpanch, who is an elected representative.

== Demography ==
According to the report published by Census India in 2011, Bajola has a total number of 87 houses and population of 552; of which include 287 males and 265 females. The literacy rate of Bajola is 77.89%, higher than the state average of 75.84%. The population of children under the age of 6 years is 68, which is 12.32% of total population of Bajola, and the child sex ratio is approximately 838 lower than state average of 846.

== Population data ==
Particulars	Total	Male	Female
Total No. of Houses	87	-	-
Population	552	287	265
Child (0–6)	68	37	31
Schedule Caste	0	0	0
Schedule Tribe	0	0	0
Literacy	77.89 %	75.60 %	80.34 %
Total Workers	192	160	32
Main Worker	173	0	0
Marginal Worker	19	16	3

== Air travel connectivity ==
The closest airport to the village is Sri Guru Ram Dass Jee International Airport.
