= Jhal Thikriwala =

- Village
- Location in Punjab, India Jhal Thikriwala (India)
- Coordinates: 31.433148°N 75.347048°E
- Country: India
- State: Punjab
- District: Kapurthala

Government
  - Type: Panchayati raj (India)
  - Body: Gram panchayat

Population (2011)
  - Total: 1,138
- Sex ratio 601/537♂/♀

Languages
  - Official: Punjabi
  - Other spoken: Hindi
- Time zone: UTC+5:30 (IST)
- PIN: 144601
- Telephone code: 01822
- ISO 3166 code: IN-PB
- Vehicle registration: PB-09
- Website: kapurthala.gov.in

Jhal Thikriwala is a village in Kapurthala district of Punjab State, India. It is located 8 kilometres (5.0 mi) from Kapurthala, which is both district and sub-district headquarters of Jhal Thikriwala. The village is administrated by a Sarpanch, who is an elected representative.

== Demography ==
According to the report published by Census India in 2011, Jhal Thikriwala has 234 houses with the total population of 1,138 persons of which 601 are male and 537 females. Literacy rate of Jhal Thikriwala is 72.86%, lower than the state average of 75.84%. The population of children in the age group 0–6 years is 169 which is 14.85% of the total population. Child sex ratio is approximately 920, higher than the state average of 846.

== Population data ==
Particulars	Total	Male	Female
Total No. of Houses	234	-	-
Population	1,138	601	537
Child (0-6)	169	88	81
Schedule Caste	1,016	530	486
Schedule Tribe	0	0	0
Literacy	72.86 %	78.36 %	66.67 %
Total Workers	419	350	69
Main Worker	373	0	0
Marginal Worker	46	23	23
