= Theh Kanjla =

- Village
- Location in Punjab, India Theh Kanjla (India)
- Coordinates: 31.436748°N 75.365994°E
- Country: India
- State: Punjab
- District: Kapurthala

Government
  - Type: Panchayati raj (India)
  - Body: Gram panchayat

Population (2011)
  - Total: 63
- Sex ratio 36/27♂/♀

Languages
  - Official: Punjabi
  - Other spoken: Hindi
- Time zone: UTC+5:30 (IST)
- PIN: 144601
- Telephone code: 01822
- ISO 3166 code: IN-PB
- Vehicle registration: PB-09
- Website: kapurthala.gov.in

Theh Kanjla is a village in Kapurthala district of Punjab State, India. It is located 8 kilometres (5.0 mi) from Kapurthala, which is both district and sub-district headquarters of Theh Kanjla. The village is administrated by a Sarpanch who is an elected representative of village as per the constitution of India and Panchayati raj (India).

== Demography ==
According to the report published by Census India in 2011, Theh Kanjla has 10 houses with the total population of 63 persons of which 36 are male and 27 females. Literacy rate of Theh Kanjla is 62.71%, lower than the state average of 75.84%. The population of children in the age group 0–6 years is 4 which is 6.35% of the total population. Child sex ratio is approximately 333, lower than the state average of 846.

== Population data ==
Particulars	Total	Male	Female
Total No. of Houses	10	-	-
Population	63	36	27
Child (0-6)	4	3	1
Schedule Caste	4	3	1
Schedule Tribe	0	0	0
Literacy	62.71 %	69.70 %	53.85 %
Total Workers	45	26	19
Main Worker	431	0	0
Marginal Worker	2	2	0
