= Saiflabad =

- Village
- Location in Punjab, India Saiflabad (India)
- Coordinates: 31.406037°N 75.246448°E
- Country: India
- State: Punjab
- District: Kapurthala

Government
  - Type: Panchayati raj (India)
  - Body: Gram panchayat

Population (2011)
  - Total: 2,018
- Sex ratio 1051/967♂/♀

Languages
  - Official: Punjabi
  - Other spoken: Hindi
- Time zone: UTC+5:30 (IST)
- PIN: 144804
- Telephone code: 01822
- ISO 3166 code: IN-PB
- Vehicle registration: PB-09
- Website: kapurthala.gov.in

Saiflabad is a village in Kapurthala district of Punjab State, India. It is located 14 kilometres (8.7 mi) from Kapurthala, which is both district and sub-district headquarters of Saiflabad. The village is administrated by a Sarpanch who is an elected representative of village as per the constitution of India and Panchayati raj (India).

== Demography ==
According to the report published by Census India in 2011, Saiflabad has 411 houses with total population of 2,018 persons of which 1,051 are male and 967 females. Literacy rate of Saiflabad is 71.28%, lower than the state average of 75.84%. The population of children in the age group 0–6 years is 211 which is 10.46% of total population. Child sex ratio is approximately 1153, higher than the state average of 846.

== Population data ==
Particulars	Total	Male	Female
Total No. of Houses	411	-	-
Population	2,018	1,051	967
Child (0-6)	211	98	113
Schedule Caste	782	403	379
Schedule Tribe	0	0	0
Literacy	71.28 %	74.82 %	67.33 %
Total Workers	681	630	51
Main Worker	661	0	0
Marginal Worker	20	10	10
