= Kishan Singhwala =

- Village
- Location in Punjab, India Kishan Singhwala (India)
- Coordinates: 31.435882°N 75.250823°E
- Country: India
- State: Punjab
- District: Kapurthala

Government
  - Type: Panchayati raj (India)
  - Body: Gram panchayat

Population (2011)
  - Total: 1,416
- Sex ratio 751/665♂/♀

Languages
  - Official: Punjabi
  - Other spoken: Hindi
- Time zone: UTC+5:30 (IST)
- PIN: 144804
- Telephone code: 01822
- ISO 3166 code: IN-PB
- Vehicle registration: PB-09
- Website: kapurthala.gov.in

Kishan Singhwala is a village in Kapurthala district of Punjab State, India. It is located 16 kilometres (9.9 mi) from Kapurthala, which is both district and sub-district headquarters of Kishan Singhwala. The village is administrated by a Sarpanch, who is an elected representative.

== Demography ==
According to the report published by Census India in 2011, Kishan Singhwala has 273 houses with the total population of 1,416 persons of which 751 are male and 665 females. Literacy rate of Kishan Singhwala is 66.88%, lower than the state average of 75.84%. The population of children in the age group 0–6 years is 190 which is 13.42% of the total population. Child sex ratio is approximately 979, higher than the state average of 846.

== Population data ==
Particulars	Total	Male	Female
Total No. of Houses	273	-	-
Population	1,416	751	665
Child (0-6)	190	96	94
Schedule Caste	1,338	716	622
Schedule Tribe	0	0	0
Literacy	66.88 %	70.84 %	62.35 %
Total Workers	457	407	50
Main Worker	443	0	0
Marginal Worker	14	11	3
