= Dhak Khurampur =

- Village
- Location in Punjab, India Dhak Khurampur (India)
- Coordinates: 31.259167°N 75.770579°E
- Country: India
- State: Punjab
- District: Kapurthala

Government
  - Type: Panchayati raj (India)
  - Body: Gram panchayat

Population (2011)
  - Total: 50
- Sex ratio 26/24♂/♀

Languages
  - Official: Punjabi
  - Other spoken: Hindi
- Time zone: UTC+5:30 (IST)
- PIN: 144401
- Telephone code: 01822
- ISO 3166 code: IN-PB
- Vehicle registration: PB-09
- Website: kapurthala.gov.in

Dhak Khurampur is a village in Phagwara Tehsil in Kapurthala district of Punjab State, India. It is located 44 kilometres (27 mi) from Kapurthala, 4 kilometres (2.5 mi) from Phagwara. The village is administrated by a Sarpanch, who is an elected representative.

== Demography ==
According to the report published by Census India in 2011, Dhak Khurampur has 9 houses with the total population of 50 persons of which 26 are male and 24 females. Literacy rate of Dhak Khurampur is 70.00%, lower than the state average of 75.84%. The population of children in the age group 0–6 years is 10 which is 20.00% of the total population. Child sex ratio is approximately 667, lower than the state average of 846.

== Population data ==
Particulars	Total	Male	Female
Total No. of Houses	9	-	-
Population	50	26	24
Child (0-6)	10	6	4
Schedule Caste	0	0	0
Schedule Tribe	0	0	0
Literacy	70.00 %	75.00 %	65.00 %
Total Workers	10	10	0
Main Worker	10	0	0
Marginal Worker	0	0	0
