= Mand Surakhpur =

- Village
- Location in Punjab, India Mand Surakhpur (India)
- Coordinates: 31.411903°N 75.272698°E
- Country: India
- State: Punjab
- District: Kapurthala

Government
  - Type: Panchayati raj (India)
  - Body: Gram panchayat

Population (2011)
  - Total: 129
- Sex ratio 65/64♂/♀

Languages
  - Official: Punjabi
  - Other spoken: Hindi
- Time zone: UTC+5:30 (IST)
- PIN: 144804
- Telephone code: 01822
- ISO 3166 code: IN-PB
- Vehicle registration: PB-09
- Website: kapurthala.gov.in

Mand Surakhpur is a village in Kapurthala district of Punjab State, India. It is located 14 kilometres (8.7 mi) from Kapurthala, which serves as both the district and sub-district headquarters for Mand Surakhpur. The village is administrated by a Sarpanch, who is an elected representative.

== Demographics ==
According to the report published by Census India in 2011, Mand Surakhpur has 24 houses with a total population of 129 persons, consisting of 65 are males and 64 females. The literacy rate of Mand Surakhpur is 79.17%, higher than the state average of 75.84%. The population of children in the age group 0–6 years is 9, which is 6.98% of the total population. The child sex ratio is approximately 125, lower than the state average of 846.

== Population data ==
Particulars	Total	Male	Female
Total No. of Houses	24	-	-
Population	129	65	64
Child (0-6)	9	8	1
Schedule Caste	0	0	0
Schedule Tribe	0	0	0
Literacy	79.17 %	80.70 %	77.78 %
Total Workers	50	44	6
Main Worker	50	0	0
Marginal Worker	0	0	0
