= Khukhrain, Kapurthala =

Khukhrain
- Village
- Location in Punjab, India Khukhrain (India)
- Coordinates: 31.426460°N 75.361622°E
- Country: India
- State: Punjab
- District: Kapurthala

Government
  - Type: Panchayati raj (India)
  - Body: Gram panchayat

Population (2011)
  - Total: 1,576
- Sex ratio 860/716♂/♀

Languages
  - Official: Punjabi
  - Other spoken: Hindi
- Time zone: UTC+5:30 (IST)
- PIN: 144601
- Telephone code: 01822
- ISO 3166 code: IN-PB
- Vehicle registration: PB-09
- Website: kapurthala.gov.in

Khukhrain is a village in Kapurthala district of Punjab State, India. It is located 8 kilometres (5.0 mi) from Kapurthala, which is both district and sub-district headquarters of Khukhrain. The village is administrated by a Sarpanch. who is an elected representative.

== Demography ==
According to the report published by Census India in 2011, Khukhrain has 295 houses with the total population of 1,576 persons of which 860 are male and 716 females. Literacy rate of Khukhrain is 64.89%, lower than the state average of 75.84%. The population of children in the age group 0–6 years is 226 which is 14.34% of the total population. Child sex ratio is approximately 752, lower than the state average of 846.

== Population data ==
Particulars	Total	Male	Female
Total No. of Houses	295	-	-
Population	1,576	860	716
Child (0-6)	226	129	97
Schedule Caste	900	497	403
Schedule Tribe	0	0	0
Literacy	64.89 %	67.03 %	62.36 %
Total Workers	480	426	54
Main Worker	429	0	0
Marginal Worker	51	33	18
