= Dhak Khati =

- Village
- Location in Punjab, India Dhak Khati (India)
- Coordinates: 31.279175°N 75.786565°E
- Country: India
- State: Punjab
- District: Kapurthala

Government
  - Type: Panchayati raj (India)
  - Body: Gram panchayat

Population (2011)
  - Total: 16
- Sex ratio 11/5♂/♀

Languages
  - Official: Punjabi
  - Other spoken: Hindi
- Time zone: UTC+5:30 (IST)
- PIN: 144401
- Telephone code: 01822
- ISO 3166 code: IN-PB
- Vehicle registration: PB-09
- Website: kapurthala.gov.in

Dhak Khati is a village in Phagwara Tehsil in Kapurthala district of Punjab State, India. It is located 50 kilometres (31 mi) from Kapurthala, 10 kilometres (6.2 mi) from Phagwara. The village is administrated by a Sarpanch, who is an elected representative.

== Demography ==
According to the report published by Census India in 2011, Dhak Khati has 3 houses with the total population of 16 persons of which 11 are male and 5 females. Literacy rate of Dhak Khati is 58.33%, lower than the state average of 75.84%. The population of children in the age group 0–6 years is 4 which is 25.00% of the total population. Child sex ratio is approximately 1000, higher than the state average of 846.

== Population data ==
Particulars	Total	Male	Female
Total No. of Houses	3	-	-
Population	16	11	5
Child (0-6)	4	2	2
Schedule Caste	0	0	0
Schedule Tribe	0	0	0
Literacy	58.33 %	66.67 %	33.33 %
Total Workers	6	4	2
Main Worker	6	0	0
Marginal Worker	0	0	0
