= Kutabpur, Kapurthala =

Kutabpur
- Village
- Location in Punjab, India Kutabpur (India)
- Coordinates: 31.340839°N 75.406794°E
- Country: India
- State: Punjab
- District: Kapurthala

Government
  - Type: Panchayati raj (India)
  - Body: Gram panchayat

Population (2011)
  - Total: 204
- Sex ratio 109/95♂/♀

Languages
  - Official: Punjabi
  - Other spoken: Hindi
- Time zone: UTC+5:30 (IST)
- PIN: 144601
- Telephone code: 01822
- ISO 3166 code: IN-PB
- Vehicle registration: PB-09
- Website: kapurthala.gov.in

Kutabpur is a village in Kapurthala district of Punjab State, India. It is located 3 kilometres (1.9 mi) from Kapurthala, which is both district and sub-district headquarters of Kutabpur. The village is administrated by a Sarpanch who is an elected representative.

== Demography ==
According to the report published by Census India in 2011, Kutabpur has 45 houses with the total population of 204 persons of which 109 are male and 95 females. Literacy rate of Kutabpur is 75.57%, lower than the state average of 75.84%. The population of children in the age group 0–6 years is 28 which is 13.73% of the total population. Child sex ratio is approximately 1000, higher than the state average of 846.

== Population data ==
Particulars	Total	Male	Female
Total No. of Houses	45	-	-
Population	204	109	95
Child (0-6)	28	14	14
Schedule Caste	6	3	3
Schedule Tribe	0	0	0
Literacy	75.57 %	80.00 %	70.37 %
Total Workers	105	68	37
Main Worker	105	0	0
Marginal Worker	0	0	0
