= Ratta Kadim =

- Village
- Location in Punjab, India Ratta Kadim (India)
- Coordinates: 31.356957°N 75.304775°E
- Country: India
- State: Punjab
- District: Kapurthala

Government
  - Type: Panchayati raj (India)
  - Body: Gram panchayat

Population (2011)
  - Total: 204
- Sex ratio 98/106♂/♀

Languages
  - Official: Punjabi
  - Other spoken: Hindi
- Time zone: UTC+5:30 (IST)
- PIN: 144628
- Telephone code: 01822
- ISO 3166 code: IN-PB
- Vehicle registration: PB-09
- Website: kapurthala.gov.in

Ratta Kadim is a village in Kapurthala district of Punjab State, India. It is located 9 kilometres (5.6 mi) from Kapurthala, which is both district and sub-district headquarters of Ratta Kadim. The village is administrated by a Sarpanch, who is an elected representative.

== Demography ==
According to the report published by Census India in 2011, Ratta Kadim has 29 houses with the total population of 204 persons of which 98 are male and 106 females. Literacy rate of Ratta Kadim is 82.16%, higher than the state average of 75.84%. The population of children in the age group 0–6 years is 19 which is 9.31% of the total population. Child sex ratio is approximately 1,082, higher than the state average of 846.

== Population data ==
Particulars	Total	Male	Female
Total No. of Houses	29	-	-
Population	204	98	106
Child (0-6)	19	8	11
Schedule Caste	92	43	49
Schedule Tribe	0	0	0
Literacy	82.16 %	86.67 %	77.89 %
Total Workers	57	56	1
Main Worker	56	0	0
Marginal Worker	1	1	0
