= Sukhani =

Suk
- Village
- Location in Punjab, India Suk (India)
- Coordinates: 31.27978°N 75.44352°E
- Country: India
- State: Punjab
- District: Kapurthala

Government
  - Type: Panchayati raj (India)
  - Body: Gram panchayat

Population (2011)
  - Total: 373
- Sex ratio 208/165♂/♀

Languages
  - Official: Punjabi
  - Other spoken: Hindi
- Time zone: UTC+5:30 (IST)
- PIN: 144623
- Telephone code: 01822
- ISO 3166 code: IN-PB
- Vehicle registration: PB-09
- Website: kapurthala.gov.in

Sukhani is a village in Kapurthala district of Punjab State, India. It is located 14 kilometres (8.7 mi) from Kapurthala, which is both district and sub-district headquarters of Sukhani. The village is administrated by a Sarpanch who is an elected representative of village as per the constitution of India and Panchayati raj (India).

== Demography ==
According to the report published by Census India in 2011, Sukhani has 97 houses with total population of 337 persons of which 208 are male and 165 females. Literacy rate of Sukhani is 68.44%, lower than the state average of 75.84%. The population of children in the age group 0–6 years is 34 which is 9.12% of total population. Child sex ratio is approximately 619, lower than the state average of 846.

== Population data ==
Particulars	Total	Male	Female
Total No. of Houses	1000	-	-
Population	373	208	165
Child (0-6)	34	21	13
Schedule Caste	169	92	77
Schedule Tribe	0	0	0
Literacy	68.44 %	72.73 %	63.16 %
Total Workers	131	121	10
Main Worker	105	0	0
Marginal Worker	26	24	2
