= Toganwala =

- Village
- Location in Punjab, India Toganwala (India)
- Coordinates: 31.256637°N 75.325799°E
- Country: India
- State: Punjab
- District: Kapurthala

Government
  - Type: Panchayati raj (India)
  - Body: Gram panchayat

Population (2011)
  - Total: 740
- Sex ratio 376/364♂/♀

Languages
  - Official: Punjabi
  - Other spoken: Hindi
- Time zone: UTC+5:30 (IST)
- PIN: 144620
- Telephone code: 01822
- ISO 3166 code: IN-PB
- Vehicle registration: PB-09
- Website: kapurthala.gov.in

Toganwala is a village in Kapurthala district of Punjab State, India. It is located 18 kilometres (11 mi) from Kapurthala, which is both district and sub-district headquarters of Toganwala. The village is administrated by a Sarpanch who is an elected representative of village as per the constitution of India and Panchayati raj (India).

== Demography ==
According to the report published by Census India in 2011, Toganwala has 135 houses with the total population of 740 persons of which 376 are male and 364 females. Literacy rate of Toganwala is 71.32%, lower than the state average of 75.84%. The population of children in the age group 0–6 years is 102 which is 13.78% of the total population. Child sex ratio is approximately 962, higher than the state average of 846.

== Population data ==
Particulars	Total	Male	Female
Total No. of Houses	135	-	-
Population	740	376	364
Child (0–6)	102	52	50
Schedule Caste	166	86	80
Schedule Tribe	0	0	0
Literacy	71.32 %	75.00 %	67.52 %
Total Workers	238	198	40
Main Worker	138	0	0
Marginal Worker	14	7	7
