= Samailpur =

- Village
- Location in Punjab, India Samailpur (India)
- Coordinates: 31.248284°N 75.453408°E
- Country: India
- State: Punjab
- District: Kapurthala

Government
  - Type: Panchayati raj (India)
  - Body: Gram panchayat

Population (2011)
  - Total: 92
- Sex ratio 50/42♂/♀

Languages
  - Official: Punjabi
  - Other spoken: Hindi
- Time zone: UTC+5:30 (IST)
- PIN: 144623
- Telephone code: 01822
- ISO 3166 code: IN-PB
- Vehicle registration: PB-09
- Website: kapurthala.gov.in

Samailpur is a village in Kapurthala district of Punjab State, India. It is located 18 kilometres (11 mi) from Kapurthala, which is both district and sub-district headquarters of Samailpur. The village is administrated by a Sarpanch who is an elected representative of village as per the constitution of India and Panchayati raj (India).

== Demography ==
According to the report published by Census India in 2011, Samailpur has 19 houses with total population of 92 persons of which 50 are male and 42 females. Literacy rate of Samailpur is 76.19%, higher than the state average of 75.84%. The population of children in the age group 0–6 years is 8 which is 8.70% of total population. Child sex ratio is approximately 1667, higher than the state average of 846.

== Population data ==
Particulars	Total	Male	Female
Total No. of Houses	19	-	-
Population	92	50	42
Child (0-6)	8	3	5
Schedule Caste	0	0	0
Schedule Tribe	0	0	0
Literacy	76.19 %	80.85 %	70.27 %
Total Workers	36	33	3
Main Worker	36	0	0
Marginal Worker	0	0	0
