= Majorwala =

- Village
- Location in Punjab, India Majorwala (India)
- Coordinates: 31.421162°N 75.328099°E
- Country: India
- State: Punjab
- District: Kapurthala

Government
  - Type: Panchayati raj (India)
  - Body: Gram panchayat

Population (2011)
  - Total: 115
- Sex ratio 51/64♂/♀

Languages
  - Official: Punjabi
  - Other spoken: Hindi
- Time zone: UTC+5:30 (IST)
- PIN: 144601
- Telephone code: 01822
- ISO 3166 code: IN-PB
- Vehicle registration: PB-09
- Website: kapurthala.gov.in

Majorwala is a village in Kapurthala district of Punjab State, India. It is located 8 kilometres (5.0 mi) from Kapurthala, which is both district and sub-district headquarters of Majorwala. The village is administrated by a Sarpanch, who is an elected representative.

== Demography ==
According to the report published by Census India in 2011, Majorwala has 20 houses with the total population of 115 persons of which 51 are male and 64 females. Literacy rate of Majorwala is 81.63%, higher than the state average of 75.84%. The population of children in the age group 0–6 years is 115 which is 14.78% of the total population. Child sex ratio is approximately 1429, higher than the state average of 846.

== Population data ==
Particulars	Total	Male	Female
Total No. of Houses	20	-	-
Population	115	51	64
Child (0-6)	17	7	10
Schedule Caste	12	4	8
Schedule Tribe	0	0	0
Literacy	81.63 %	81.82 %	81.48 %
Total Workers	23	20	3
Main Worker	23	0	0
Marginal Worker	0	0	0
