= Khangah, Kapurthala =

Khangah
- Village
- Location in Punjab, India Khangah (India)
- Coordinates: 31.413458°N 75.333930°E
- Country: India
- State: Punjab
- District: Kapurthala

Government
  - Type: Panchayati raj (India)
  - Body: Gram panchayat

Population (2011)
  - Total: 501
- Sex ratio 253/248♂/♀

Languages
  - Official: Punjabi
  - Other spoken: Hindi
- Time zone: UTC+5:30 (IST)
- PIN: 144601
- Telephone code: 01822
- ISO 3166 code: IN-PB
- Vehicle registration: PB-09

Khangah is a village in Kapurthala district of Punjab State, India. It is located 6 kilometres (3.7 mi) from Kapurthala, which is both district and sub-district headquarters of Khangah. The village is administrated by a Sarpanch, who is an elected representative.

== Demography ==
According to the report published by Census India in 2011, Khangah has 96 houses with the total population of 501 persons of which 253 are male and 248 females. Literacy rate of Khangah is 77.53%, higher than the state average of 75.84%. The population of children in the age group 0–6 years is 56 which is 11.18% of the total population. Child sex ratio is approximately 931, higher than the state average of 846.

== Population data ==
Particulars	Total	Male	Female
Total No. of Houses	96	-	-
Population	501	253	248
Child (0-6)	56	29	27
Schedule Caste	382	186	196
Schedule Tribe	0	0	0
Literacy	77.53 %	82.59 %	72.40 %
Total Workers	134	120	14
Main Worker	132	0	0
Marginal Worker	2	2	0
