= Alaudinpur =

- Village
- Location in Punjab, India Alaudinpur (India)
- Country: India
- State: Punjab
- District: Kapurthala

Government
  - Type: Panchayati raj (India)
  - Body: Gram panchayat

Languages
  - Official: Punjabi
  - Other spoken: Hindi
- Time zone: UTC+5:30 (IST)
- Telephone code: 01822
- ISO 3166 code: IN-PB
- Vehicle registration: PB-09
- Website: kapurthala.gov.in

Alaudinpur is a village in Kapurthala tehsil in Kapurthala district of Punjab State, India. It is located 10 km away from Kapurthala. The village is administrated by Sarpanch an elected representative of the village.

== Demography ==
As of 2011, Alaudinpur has a total number of 239 houses and population of 1171 of which 612 are males while 559 are females according to the report published by Census India in 2011. Literacy rate of Alaudinpur is 73.83%, lower than state average of 75.84%. The population of children under the age of 6 years is 128 which is 10.93% of total population of Alaudinpur, and child sex ratio is approximately 641 lower than state average of 846.

== Population data ==
Particulars	Total	Male	Female
Total No. of Houses	239	-	-
Population	1,171	612	559
Child (0–6)	128	78	50
Schedule Caste	953	502	451
Schedule Tribe	0	0	0
Literacy	73.83 %	78.28 %	69.16 %
Total Workers	389	339	50
Main Worker	375	0	0
Marginal Worker	14	7	7
