= Behlolpur, Kapurthala =

Behlolpur
- Village
- Location in Punjab, India Behlolpur (India)
- Coordinates: 31.404806°N 74.947506°E
- Country: India
- State: Punjab
- District: Kapurthala

Government
  - Type: Panchayati raj (India)
  - Body: Gram panchayat

Population (2011)
  - Total: 603
- Sex ratio 312/291♂/♀

Languages
  - Official: Punjabi
  - Other spoken: Hindi
- Time zone: UTC+5:30 (IST)
- PIN: 144802
- Telephone code: 01822
- ISO 3166 code: IN-PB
- Vehicle registration: PB-09
- Website: kapurthala.gov.in

Behlolpur is a village in Kapurthala district of Punjab State, India. It is located 16 kilometres (9.9 mi) from Kapurthala, which is both district and sub-district headquarters of Behlolpur. It is administrated by a Sarpanch who is an elected representative.

== Demography ==
According to the report published by Census India in 2011, Behlolpur has a total number of 111 households and population of 603 of which includes 312 males and 291 females. Literacy rate of Behlolpur is 57.66%, lower than state average of 75.84%. The population of children under the age of 6 years is 81 which is 13.43% of total population of Behlolpur, and child sex ratio is approximately 723 lower than state average of 846.

== Air travel connectivity ==
The closest airport to the village is Sri Guru Ram Dass Jee International Airport.
