= Jeorgepur Urf Merry Pur =

Georgepur
- Village
- Location in Punjab, India Georgepur (India)
- Coordinates: 31.274445°N 75.256656°E
- Country: India
- State: Punjab
- District: Kapurthala

Government
  - Type: Panchayati raj (India)
  - Body: Gram panchayat

Languages
  - Official: Punjabi
  - Other spoken: Hindi, English
- Time zone: UTC+5:30 (IST)
- PIN: 144606
- Telephone code: 01822
- ISO 3166 code: IN-PB
- Vehicle registration: PB-09
- Website: kapurthala.gov.in

Georgepur is a village in Sultanpur Lodhi tehsil in Kapurthala district of Punjab, India. It is located 8 kilometres (5.0 mi) from the city of Sultanpur Lodhi, 20 kilometres (12 mi) away from district headquarter Kapurthala. The village is administrated by a Sarpanch who is an elected representative of village as per the constitution of India and Panchayati raj (India). It is located in the middle of Marrypur & Jainpur.

== List of cities near the village ==
- Bhulath
- Kapurthala
- Phagwara
- Sultanpur Lodhi
- Marrypur
- Jainpur
- Dudwindi
- Kalru
- Jangla
- Boolpur
- Maseetan

== Air travel connectivity ==
The closest International airport to the village is Sri Guru Ram Dass Jee International Airport.
