= Bohani, Phagwara =

Bohani
- Village
- Location in Punjab, India Bohani (India)
- Coordinates: 31.331397°N 75.721885°E
- Country: India
- State: Punjab
- District: Kapurthala

Government
  - Type: Panchayati raj (India)
  - Body: Gram panchayat

Population (2011)
  - Total: 1,346
- Sex ratio 688/658♂/♀

Languages
  - Official: Punjabi
  - Other spoken: Hindi
- Time zone: UTC+5:30 (IST)
- PIN: 144401
- Telephone code: 01822
- ISO 3166 code: IN-PB
- Vehicle registration: PB-09
- Website: kapurthala.gov.in

Bohani is a village in Tehsil Phagwara, Kapurthala district, in Punjab, India. It is located 15 kilometres (9.3 mi) away from sub-district headquarter Phagwara and 43 km away from district headquarter Kapurthala. The village is administrated by a Sarpanch who is an elected representative of village as per the constitution of India and Panchayati raj (India).

== Transport ==
Bolinna Doaba Railway Station and Chiheru Railway Station are the very nearby railway stations to Bohani, while Jalandhar City Railway station is 12 km away from the village. The village is 106 km away from Sri Guru Ram Dass Jee International Airport in Amritsar and the other nearest airport is Sahnewal Airport in Ludhiana which is located 55 km away from the village.
