= Balaloan =

- Village
- Location in Punjab, India Balaloan (India)
- Coordinates: 31.224020°N 75.770801°E
- Country: India
- State: Punjab
- District: Kapurthala

Government
  - Type: Panchayati raj (India)
  - Body: Gram panchayat

Population (2011)
  - Total: 133
- Sex ratio 77/56♂/♀

Languages
  - Official: Punjabi
  - Other spoken: Hindi
- Time zone: UTC+5:30 (IST)
- PIN: 144401
- Telephone code: 01822
- ISO 3166 code: IN-PB
- Vehicle registration: PB-09
- Website: kapurthala.gov.in

Balaloan is a village in Tehsil Phagwara, Kapurthala district, in Punjab, India. It is located 10 kilometres (6.2 mi) away from sub-district headquarter Phagwara and 44 km away from district headquarter Kapurthala. The village is administrated by a Sarpanch, who is an elected representative.

== Transport ==
Phagwara Junction Railway Station, Mauli Halt Railway Station are the nearby railway stations to Balaloan. Jalandhar City Rail Way station is 23 km away from the village. The village is 118 km away from Sri Guru Ram Dass Jee International Airport in Amritsar. Another nearby airport is Sahnewal Airport in Ludhiana which is located 40 km away from the village.
