= Passan =

- Village
- Location in Punjab, India Passan (India)
- Coordinates: 31.303245°N 75.408251°E
- Country: India
- State: Punjab
- District: Kapurthala

Government
  - Type: Panchayati raj (India)
  - Body: Gram panchayat

Population (2011)
  - Total: 62
- Sex ratio 32/30♂/♀

Languages
  - Official: Punjabi
  - Other spoken: Hindi
- Time zone: UTC+5:30 (IST)
- PIN: 144602
- Telephone code: 01822
- ISO 3166 code: IN-PB
- Vehicle registration: PB-09
- Website: kapurthala.gov.in

Passan is a village in Kapurthala district of Punjab State, India. It is located 10 kilometres (6.2 mi) from Kapurthala, which is both district and sub-district headquarters of Passan. The village is administrated by a Sarpanch who is an elected representative.

== Demography ==
According to the 2011 Census of India, Passan had 10 houses with total population of 62 persons of which 32 were male and 30 female. The literacy rate was 45.10%, lower than the state average of 75.84%. The population of children in the age group 0–6 years was 11 and the child sex ratio was approximately 1200, higher than the state average of 846.

== Air travel connectivity ==
The closest airport to the village is Sri Guru Ram Dass Jee International Airport.
