= Saido Bholana =

- Village
- Location in Punjab, India Saido Bholana (India)
- Coordinates: 31.307559°N 75.336845°E
- Country: India
- State: Punjab
- District: Kapurthala

Government
  - Type: Panchayati raj (India)
  - Body: Gram panchayat

Population (2011)
  - Total: 5,103
- Sex ratio 2751/2352♂/♀

Languages
  - Official: Punjabi
  - Other spoken: Hindi
- Time zone: UTC+5:30 (IST)
- PIN: 144602
- Telephone code: 01822
- ISO 3166 code: IN-PB
- Vehicle registration: PB-09
- Website: kapurthala.gov.in

Saido Bholana is a village in Kapurthala district of Punjab State, India. It is located 9 kilometres (5.6 mi) from Kapurthala, which is both district and sub-district headquarters of Saido Bholana. The village is administrated by a Sarpanch who is an elected representative.

== Transport ==
Kapurthala Railway Station, Rail Coach Fact Railway Station are nearby railway stations. Jalandhar City Railway Station is 23 km away from the village. The village is 73 km away from Sri Guru Ram Dass Jee International Airport in Amritsar. Another nearby airport is Sahnewal Airport in Ludhiana which is located 77 km away from the village.
