= Randhawa, Kapurthala =

Randhawa
- Village
- Location in Punjab, India Randhawa (India)
- Coordinates: 31.466253°N 75.367452°E
- Country: India
- State: Punjab
- District: Kapurthala

Government
  - Type: Panchayati raj (India)
  - Body: Gram panchayat

Population (2011)
  - Total: 458
- Sex ratio 239/219♂/♀

Languages
  - Official: Punjabi
  - Other spoken: Hindi
- Time zone: UTC+5:30 (IST)
- PIN: 144804
- Telephone code: 01822
- ISO 3166 code: IN-PB
- Vehicle registration: PB-09
- Website: kapurthala.gov.in

Randhawa is a village in Kapurthala district of Punjab State, India, 15 kilometres (9.3 mi) from Kapurthala, which is both district and sub-district headquarters of KaRandhawahna. The village is administrated by a Sarpanch, an elected representative.

== Demography ==
According to the report by Census India in 2011, Randhawa had 82 houses and a population of 458, including 239 males and 219 females. Its literacy rate was 78.71%, higher than the state average of 75.84%. It had 40 children under the age of 6 years, or 8.73% of its total population, and its child sex ratio is approximately 739, lower than the state average of 846.
