= Mand Hazara =

- Village
- Location in Punjab, India Mand Hazara (India)
- Coordinates: 31.229246°N 75.074256°E
- Country: India
- State: Punjab
- District: Kapurthala

Government
  - Type: Panchayati raj in India
  - Body: Gram panchayat

Languages
  - Official: Punjabi
  - Other spoken: Hindi
- Time zone: UTC+5:30 (IST)
- PIN: 144626
- Telephone code: 01822
- ISO 3166 code: IN-PB
- Vehicle registration: PB-09
- Website: kapurthala.gov.in

Mand Hazara is a village in Sultanpur Lodhi tehsil in Kapurthala district of Punjab, India. Mand Hazara village is located in Sultanpur Lodhi Tehsil of Kapurthala district in Punjab, India. Kapurthala and Sultanpur Lodhi are the district & sub-district headquarters of Mand Hazara village respectively. The village is administrated by a Sarpanch who is an elected representative of village as per the constitution of India and Panchayati raj in India.

== List of cities near the village ==
- Bhulath
- Kapurthala
- Phagwara
- Sultanpur Lodhi

== Air travel connectivity ==
The closest International airport to the village is Sri Guru Ram Dass Jee International Airport.
