= Salehpur Dona =

- Village
- Location in Punjab, India Salehpur Dona (India)
- Coordinates: 31.371480°N 75.393681°E
- Country: India
- State: Punjab
- District: Kapurthala

Government
  - Type: Panchayati raj (India)
  - Body: Gram panchayat

Languages
  - Official: Punjabi
  - Other spoken: Hindi
- Time zone: UTC+5:30 (IST)
- PIN: 144626
- Telephone code: 01822
- ISO 3166 code: IN-PB
- Vehicle registration: PB-09
- Website: kapurthala.gov.in

Salehpur Dona is a village in Sultanpur Lodhi tehsil in Kapurthala district of Punjab, India, 15 kilometres (9.3 mi) from the city of Sultanpur Lodhi and 20 kilometres (12 mi) from district headquarters Kapurthala. The village is administered by a sarpanch who is an elected representative of village as per the constitution of India and Panchayati raj (India).

The village has a population of 286, 142 of whom are male, and 144 females. The village has about 49 households.
