= Jabo Sudhar =

- Village
- Country: India
- State: Punjab
- District: Kapurthala
- Tehsil: Sultanpur Lodhi
- Region: Majha

Government
  - Type: Panchayat raj
  - Body: Gram panchayat

Area
  - Total: 196.27 ha (485.0 acres)

Population (2011)
  - Total: 614; 324/290 ♂/♀
  - Scheduled Castes: 260; 129/131 ♂/♀
  - Total Households: 100

Languages
  - Official: Punjabi
- Time zone: UTC+5:30 (IST)
- ISO 3166 code: IN-PB
- Website: kapurthala.gov.in

Jabo Sudhar is a village in Sultanpur Lodhi in Kapurthala district of Punjab State, India. It is located 4 kilometres (2.5 mi) from sub district headquarter and 30 kilometres (19 mi) from district headquarter. The village is administrated by Sarpanch an elected representative of the village.

== Demography ==
As of 2011, The village has a total number of 100 houses and the population of 614 of which 324 are males while 290 are females. According to the report published by Census India in 2011, out of the total population of the village 260 people are from Schedule Caste and the village does not have any Schedule Tribe population so far.

== See also ==
- List of villages in India
