= Bharowana =

Coordinates: 31°10′N 75°05′E

- Village
- Location in Punjab, India Bharowana (India)
- Country: India
- State: Punjab
- District: Kapurthala
- Tehsil: Sultanpur Lodhi
- Region: Majha

Government
  - Type: Panchayat raj
  - Body: Gram panchayat

Area
  - Total: 365.84 ha (904.0 acres)

Population (2011)
  - Total: 672; 357/315 ♂/♀
  - Scheduled Castes: 330; 169/161 ♂/♀
  - Total Households: 148

Languages
  - Official: Punjabi
- Time zone: UTC+5:30 (IST)
- ISO 3166 code: IN-PB
- Website: kapurthala.gov.in

Bharowana is a village in Sultanpur Lodhi in Kapurthala district of Punjab State, India. It is located 15 kilometres (9.3 mi) from sub district headquarter and 40 kilometres (25 mi) from district headquarter. The village is administrated by Sarpanch an elected representative of the village.

== Demography ==
As of 2011, the village has a total number of 148 houses and a population of 672 of which 357 are males while 315 are females. According to the report published by Census India in 2011, out of the total population of the village 330 people are from Schedule Caste and the village does not have any Schedule Tribe population so far.

== See also ==
- List of villages in India
