= Kalubhatia =

- Village
- Location in Punjab, India Kalubhatia (India)
- Coordinates: 31.347413°N 75.223111°E
- Country: India
- State: Punjab
- District: Kapurthala

Government
  - Type: Panchayati raj (India)
  - Body: Gram panchayat

Languages
  - Official: Punjabi
  - Other spoken: Hindi
- Time zone: UTC+5:30 (IST)
- PIN: 144628
- Telephone code: 01822
- ISO 3166 code: IN-PB
- Vehicle registration: PB-09
- Website: kapurthala.gov.in

Kalubhatia is a village in Sultanpur Lodhi tehsil in Kapurthala district of Punjab, India. It is located 16 kilometres (9.9 mi) from the city of Sultanpur Lodhi, 25 kilometres (16 mi) away from district headquarter Kapurthala. The village is administrated by a Sarpanch who is an elected representative of village as per the constitution of India and Panchayati raj (India).

== History and demographics ==
The village was founded by Chaudry Kalu Bhatia who belonged to the Gujjar caste. The name of the village was accordingly coined in his name. He had one son named Ch Peer Bakhsh who had three sons namely Chaudhry Bandu, Chaudhry Jhandu and Chaudhry Elahi Bukhsh. Their children migrated to western Punjab in 1947 on partition, living in districts Vehari, Sheikhupura and Sarghodha as landlords and businessmen. Most of them are highly educated and serving the Government in different capacities.

== Gallery ==
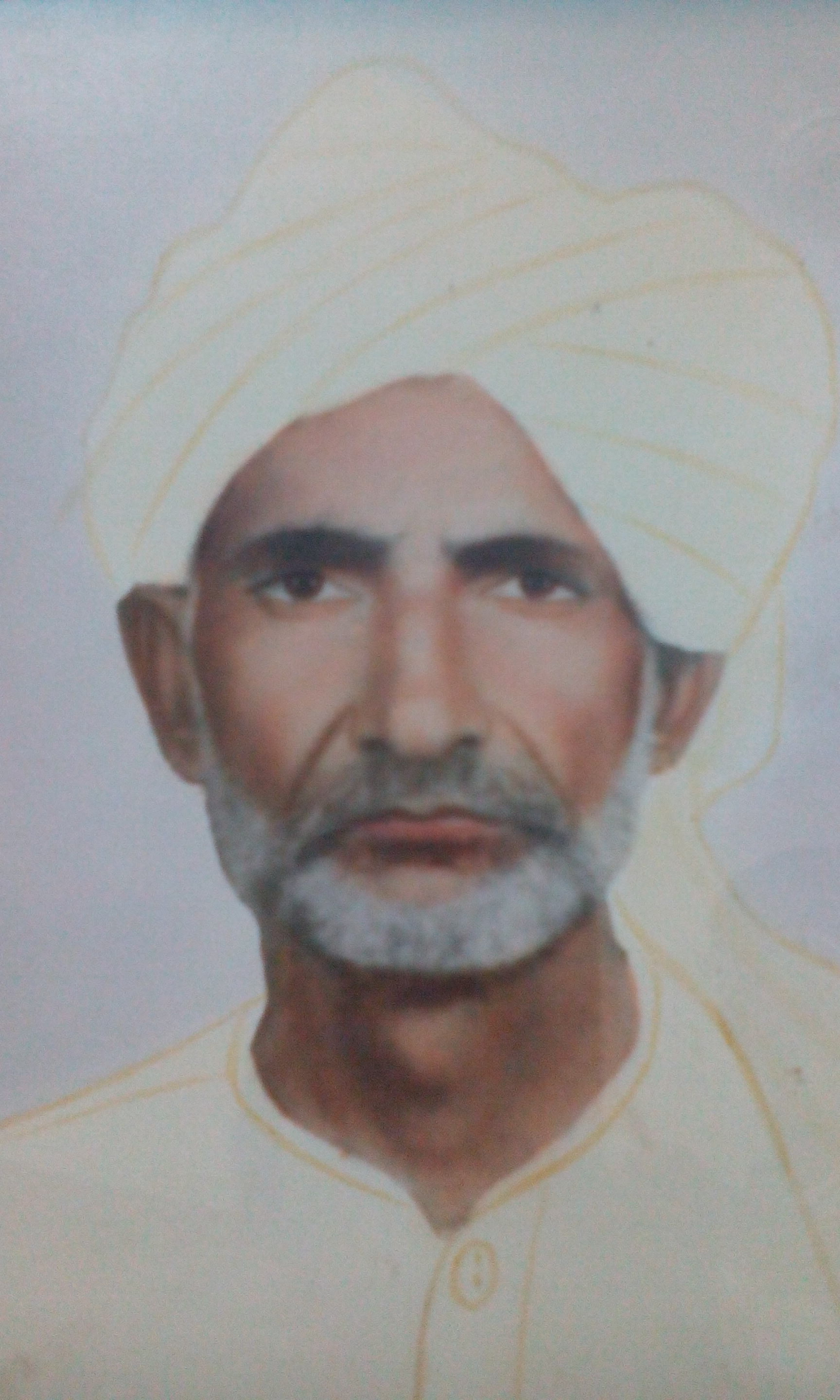
Ch Fazal Muhammad (Late) Son of Ch Elahi Bakhsh Bhatia

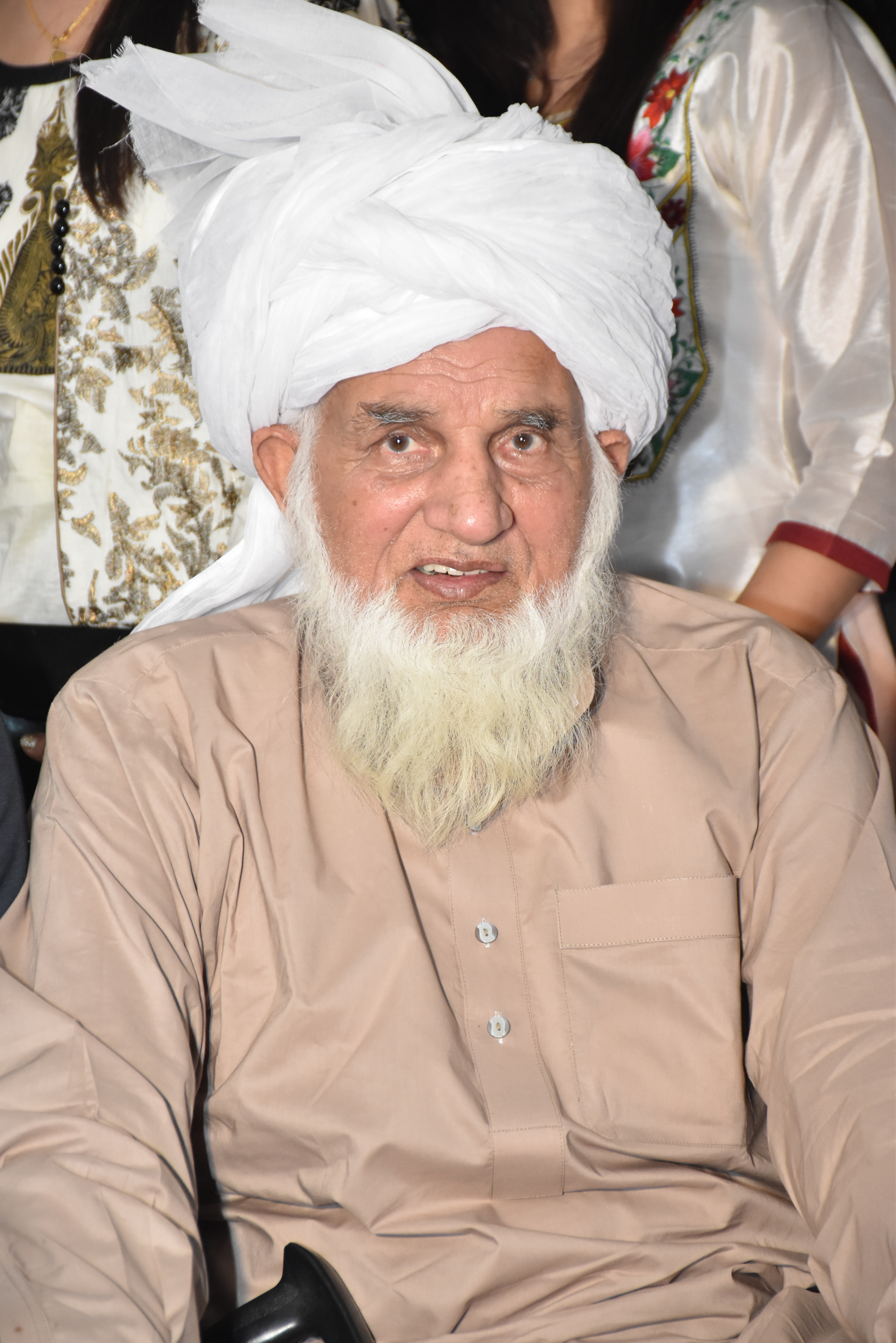
Ch Nazar Hussain Bhatia, Eldest surviving Great Grandson of Ch Kalu Bhatia (Founder of Village)

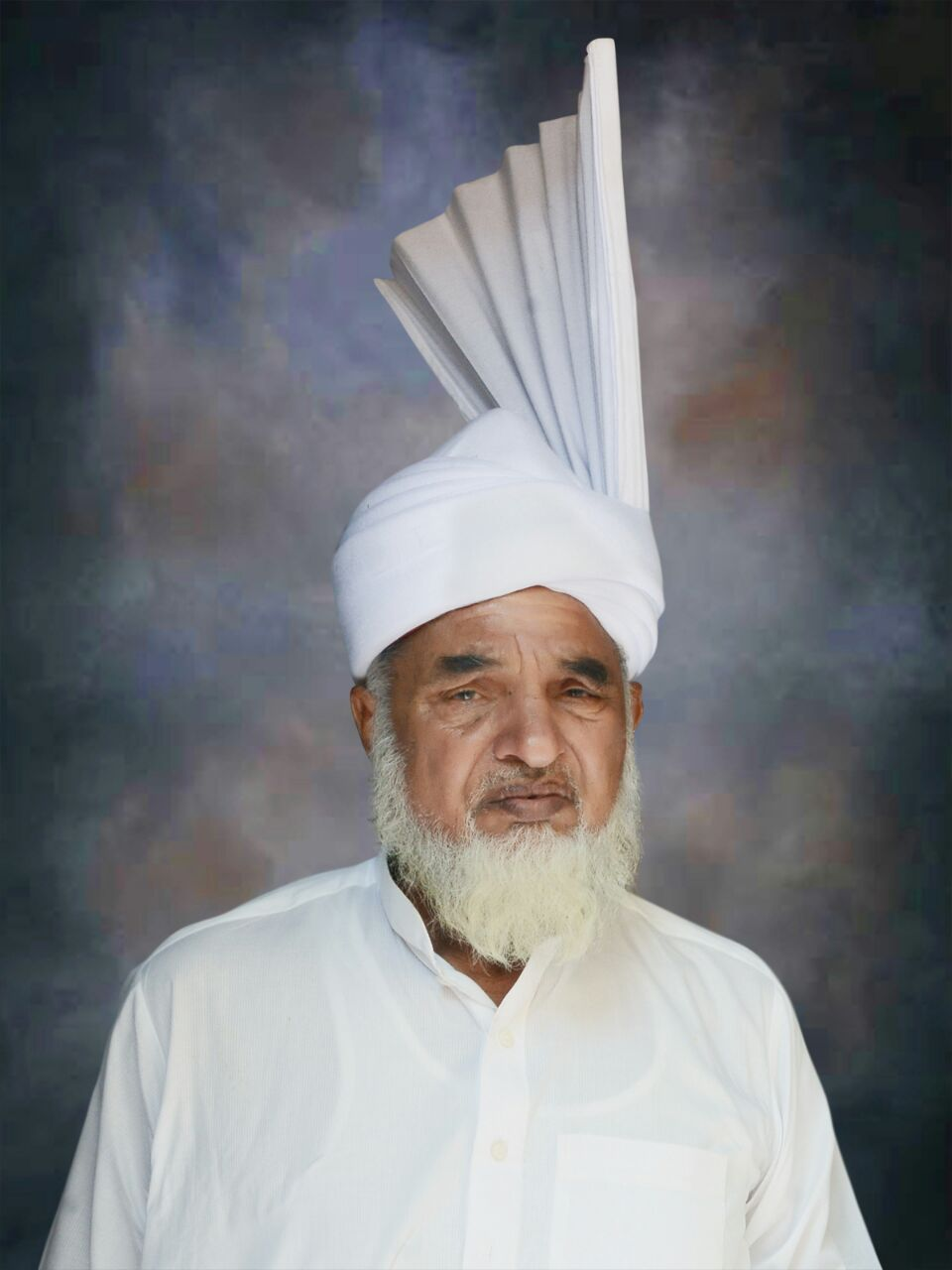
Ch Muhammad Hussain Bhatia, Great Grandson of Ch Kalu Bhatia

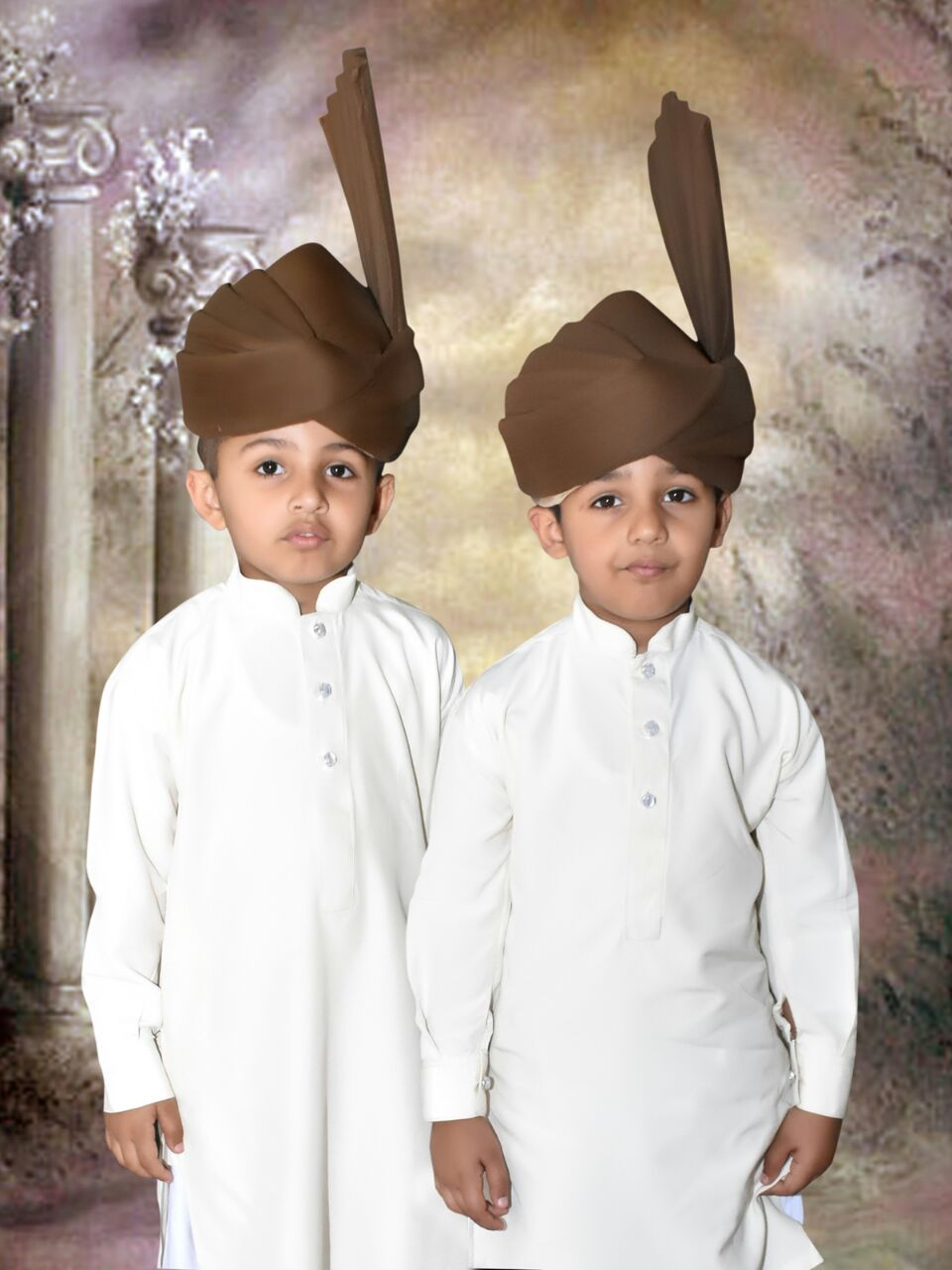
Abdullah Hussain Bhatia & Aayan Hussain Bhatia, Great Grandsons of Ch Kalu Bhatia

== List of cities near the village ==
- Bhulath
- Kapurthala
- Phagwara
- Sultanpur Lodhi

== Air travel connectivity ==
The closest International airport to the village is Sri Guru Ram Dass Jee International Airport.
