= Mand Inderpur =

- Village
- Country: India
- State: Punjab
- District: Kapurthala
- Tehsil: Sultanpur Lodhi
- Region: Majha

Government
  - Type: Panchayat raj
  - Body: Gram panchayat

Area
  - Total: 43.58 ha (107.7 acres)

Population (2011)
  - Total: 159; 78/81 ♂/♀
  - Scheduled Castes: 130; 61/69 ♂/♀
  - Total Households: 34

Languages
  - Official: Punjabi
- Time zone: UTC+5:30 (IST)
- ISO 3166 code: IN-PB
- Website: kapurthala.gov.in

Mand Inderpur is a village in Sultanpur Lodhi in Kapurthala district of Punjab State, India. It is located 20 kilometres (12 mi) from sub district headquarter and 45 kilometres (28 mi) from district headquarter. The village is administrated by Sarpanch an elected representative of the village.

== Demography ==
As of 2011, The village has a total number of 34 houses and the population of 159 of which 78 are males while 81 are females. According to the report published by Census India in 2011, out of the total population of the village 130 people are from Schedule Caste and the village does not have any Schedule Tribe population so far.

== See also ==
- List of villages in India
