= Bharoana =

Bharoana Bharoana ਭਰੋਆਣਾ
- Village
- Country: India
- State: Punjab
- District: Kapurthala
- Talukas: Sultanpur Lodhi

Languages
  - Official: Punjabi
  - Regional: Punjabi
- Time zone: UTC+5:30 (IST)
- Vehicle registration: PB-09

Bharoana is a village in Sultanpur Lodhi tehsil of Kapurthala district in Punjab, India. It was affected by the floods with other villages of the tehsil in 2008.
