= Latianwala =

- Village
- Location in Punjab, India Latianwala (India)
- Coordinates: 31.216758°N 75.301859°E
- Country: India
- State: Punjab
- District: Kapurthala

Government
  - Type: Panchayati raj (India)
  - Body: Gram panchayat

Languages
  - Official: Punjabi
  - Other spoken: Hindi
- Time zone: UTC+5:30 (IST)
- PIN: 144629
- Telephone code: 01822
- ISO 3166 code: IN-PB
- Vehicle registration: PB-09
- Website: kapurthala.gov.in

Latianwala is a village in Sultanpur Lodhi tehsil in Kapurthala district of Punjab, India. It is located 12 kilometres (7.5 mi) from Sultanpur Lodhi and 20 kilometres (12 mi) away from the district headquarters Kapurthala. The village is administrated by a sarpanch, who is an elected representative of the village.

== Air travel connectivity ==
The closest airport to the village is Sri Guru Ram Dass Jee International Airport.

== List of cities near the village ==
- Bhulath
- Kapurthala
- Phagwara
- Sultanpur Lodhi

== Air travel connectivity ==
The closest International airport to the village is Sri Guru Ram Dass Jee International Airport.
