= Baoopur Kadim =

- Village
- Location in Punjab, India Baoopur Kadim (India)
- Coordinates: 31.255753°N 75.109293°E
- Country: India
- State: Punjab
- District: Kapurthala

Government
  - Type: Panchayati raj (India)
  - Body: Gram panchayat

Languages
  - Official: Punjabi
  - Other spoken: Hindi
- Time zone: UTC+5:30 (IST)
- PIN: 144626
- Telephone code: 01822
- ISO 3166 code: IN-PB
- Vehicle registration: PB-09
- Website: kapurthala.gov.in

Baoopur Kadim is a village in Sultanpur Lodhi tehsil in the Kapurthala district of Punjab, India.

Kadim is the Arabic word for old. It is located 20 kilometres (12 mi) from the city of Sultanpur Lodhi, 45 kilometres (28 mi) away from district headquarter Kapurthala.

The village is administrated by a Sarpanch who is an elected representative of the village as per the constitution of India and Panchayati raj (India).

== List of cities near the village ==
- Bhulath
- Kapurthala
- Phagwara
- Sultanpur Lodhi

== Air travel connectivity ==
The closest International airport to the village is Sri Guru Ram Dass Jee International Airport.
