= Haidrabad Bet =

- Village
- Location in Punjab, India Haidrabad Bet (India)
- Coordinates: 31.254578°N 75.170590°E
- Country: India
- State: Punjab
- District: Kapurthala

Government
  - Type: Panchayati raj (India)
  - Body: Gram panchayat

Languages
  - Official: Punjabi
  - Other spoken: Hindi
- Time zone: UTC+5:30 (IST)
- PIN: 144620
- Telephone code: 01822
- ISO 3166 code: IN-PB
- Vehicle registration: PB-09
- Website: kapurthala.gov.in

Haidrabad Bet is a village in Sultanpur Lodhi tehsil in Kapurthala district of Punjab, India. It is located 4 kilometres (2.5 mi) from the city of Sultanpur Lodhi, 31 kilometres (19 mi) away from district headquarter Kapurthala. The village is administrated by a Sarpanch who is an elected representative of village as per the constitution of India and Panchayati raj (India).

== List of cities near the village ==
- Bhulath
- Kapurthala
- Phagwara
- Sultanpur Lodhi

== Air travel connectivity ==
The closest International airport to the village is Sri Guru Ram Dass Jee International Airport.
