= Sultanpur Rural =

- Village
- Country: India
- State: Punjab
- District: Kapurthala
- Tehsil: Sultanpur Lodhi
- Region: Doaba

Government
  - Type: Panchayat raj
  - Body: Gram panchayat

Area
  - Total: 105.62 ha (261.0 acres)

Population (2011)
  - Total: 2,105; 1,085/1,020 ♂/♀
  - Scheduled Castes: 481; 245/236 ♂/♀
  - Total Households: 416

Languages
  - Official: Punjabi
- Time zone: UTC+5:30 (IST)
- ISO 3166 code: IN-PB
- Website: kapurthala.gov.in

Sultanpur Rural is a village in Sultanpur Lodhi in Kapurthala district of Punjab State, India. It is located 26 kilometres (16 mi) from sub district headquarter and 25 kilometres (16 mi) from district headquarter. The village is administrated by Sarpanch an elected representative of the village.

== Demography ==
As of 2011, The village has a total number of 416 houses and the population of 2105 of which 1085 are males while 1020 are females. According to the report published by Census India in 2011, out of the total population of the village 481 people are from Schedule Caste and the village does not have any Schedule Tribe population so far.

== See also ==
- List of villages in India
