= Amarjitpur =

- Village
- Location in Punjab, India Amarjitpur (India)
- Coordinates: 31.190032°N 75.240614°E
- Country: India
- State: Punjab
- District: Kapurthala

Government
  - Type: Panchayati raj (India)
  - Body: Gram panchayat

Languages
  - Official: Punjabi
  - Other spoken: Hindi
- Time zone: UTC+5:30 (IST)
- PIN: 144626
- Telephone code: 01822
- ISO 3166 code: IN-PB
- Vehicle registration: PB-09
- Website: kapurthala.gov.in

Amarjitpur is a village in Sultanpur Lodhi tehsil in Kapurthala district of Punjab, India. It is located 5 kilometres (3.1 mi) from the city of Sultanpur Lodhi, 27 kilometres (17 mi) away from district headquarters, Kapurthala. The village is administrated by a Sarpanch who is an elected representative of village as per the constitution of India and Panchayati raj (India).
