= Mohib Banda =

Mohib Banda محب بانڈہ Mobe
- Village and Union Council
- Location in Khyber Pakhtunkhwa, Pakistan Mohib Banda (Khyber Pakhtunkhwa)
- Coordinates: 34.1977°N 72.1146°E
- Country: Pakistan
- Province: Khyber Pakhtunkhwa
- District: Mardan District
- Time zone: UTC+5 (PST)

Mohib Banda (commonly known as Mobe) is a village and union council located in Mardan District of Khyber Pakhtunkhwa, Pakistan.

== Geography ==
Mohib Banda is situated at approximately 34.1977°N 72.1146°E. The village consists of predominantly agricultural land with a dispersed rural settlement pattern.

The boundaries of the village are described as follows:

- North: Extends toward the northern agricultural belt and local road network.
- South: Extends approximately 3 kilometres from the village centre into rural farmland.
- East: Bordered by areas leading toward Garhi Kapura.
- West: Extends toward a western tributary (locally known as Erab), approximately 400 metres from its bank.

== Landmarks ==
Ghazi Baba Chowk is a notable local landmark located approximately 500 metres from Mohib Banda and serves as an important junction connecting nearby areas.

== Demographics ==
Detailed population data at the village level is not separately published in official census reports. Mohib Banda forms part of the wider population of Mardan District.

According to the 2017 Census of Pakistan, Mardan District has a population of 2,373,061.

== Education ==
Mohib Banda has government educational institutions operating under the Elementary and Secondary Education Department of Khyber Pakhtunkhwa.
