= Sultanpur Lodhi =

Sultanpur Lodhi White City
- City
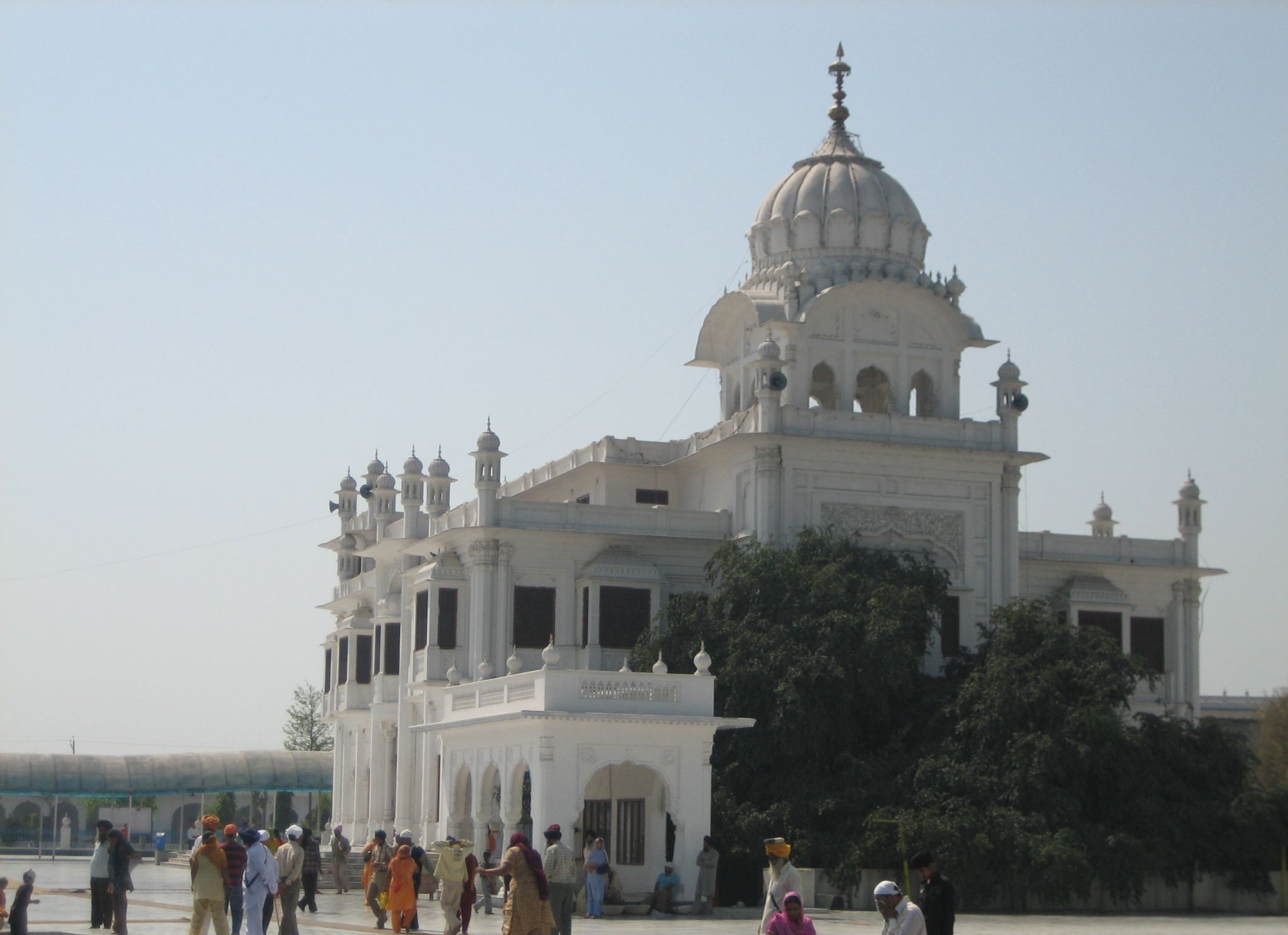
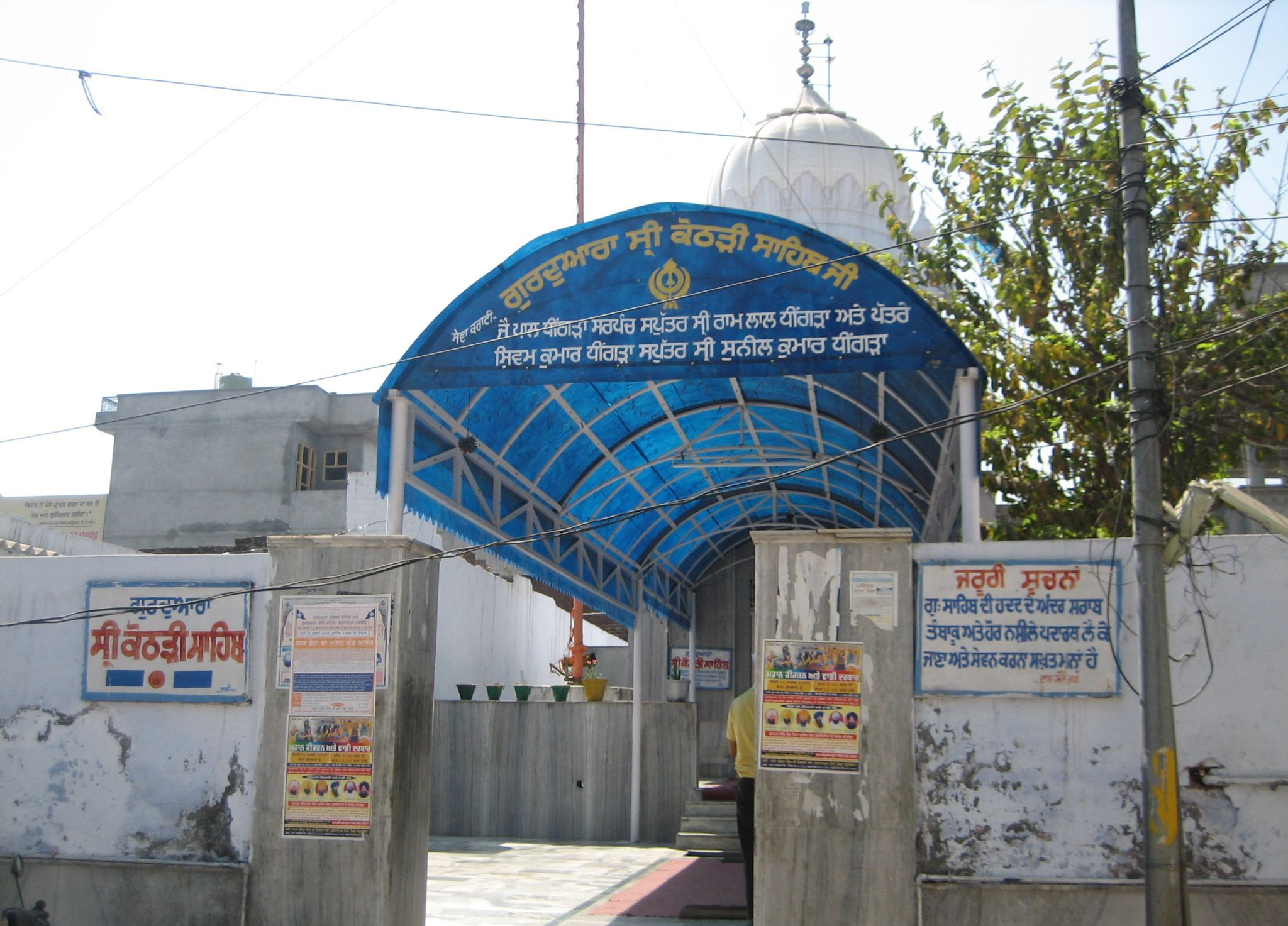
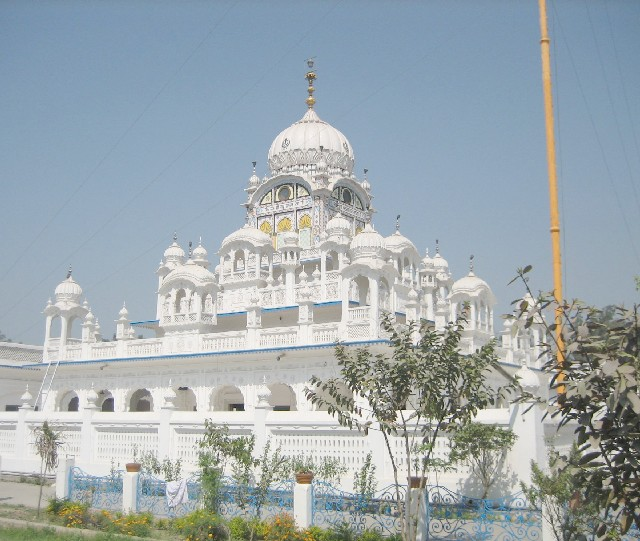
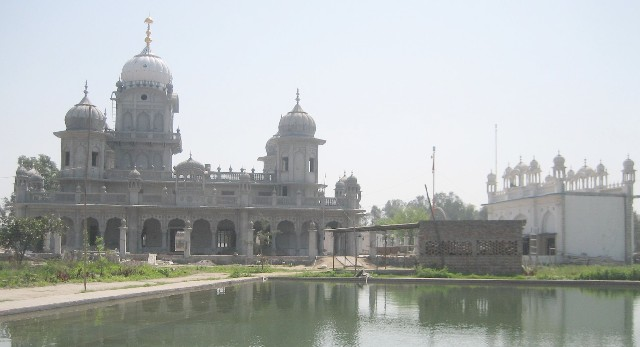
- Gurdwara Sri Ber Sahib, Gurudwara Antaryamta Sahib, Gurudwara Kothri Sahib, Gurudwara Hatt Sahib

- Location in Punjab, India
- Coordinates: 31.2131777°N 75.1984978°E
- Country: India
- State: Punjab
- District: Kapurthala
- Established: 1969

Government
  - MLA: Mr. Rana Inderpartap Singh

Area
  - Total: 6 km^{2} (2.3 sq mi)

Population (2011)
  - Total: 16,855
  - Density: 2,800/km^{2} (7,300/sq mi)

Languages
  - Official: Punjabi, Hindi
- Time zone: UTC+5:30 (IST)
- PIN: 144626
- Vehicle registration: PB-41

Sultanpur Lodhi is a city and a Municipal Council, 17 miles (27 km) from Kapurthala city in the Kapurthala district in the Indian state of Punjab. The town is named after its founder, Bahlul Khan Lodi, the future Sultan of Delhi who renamed the town in 1443 C.E. during his time as governor of Punjab, and was also mentioned in the Ain-e-Akbari. Sultanpur Lodhi is on the south bank of a seasonal rivulet called Kali Bein, which runs 6 miles (9.7 km) north of the confluence of the Beas and Sutlej rivers of Punjab.

== History ==
Sultanpur Lodhi was established in the 1st century.

=== Ancient ===
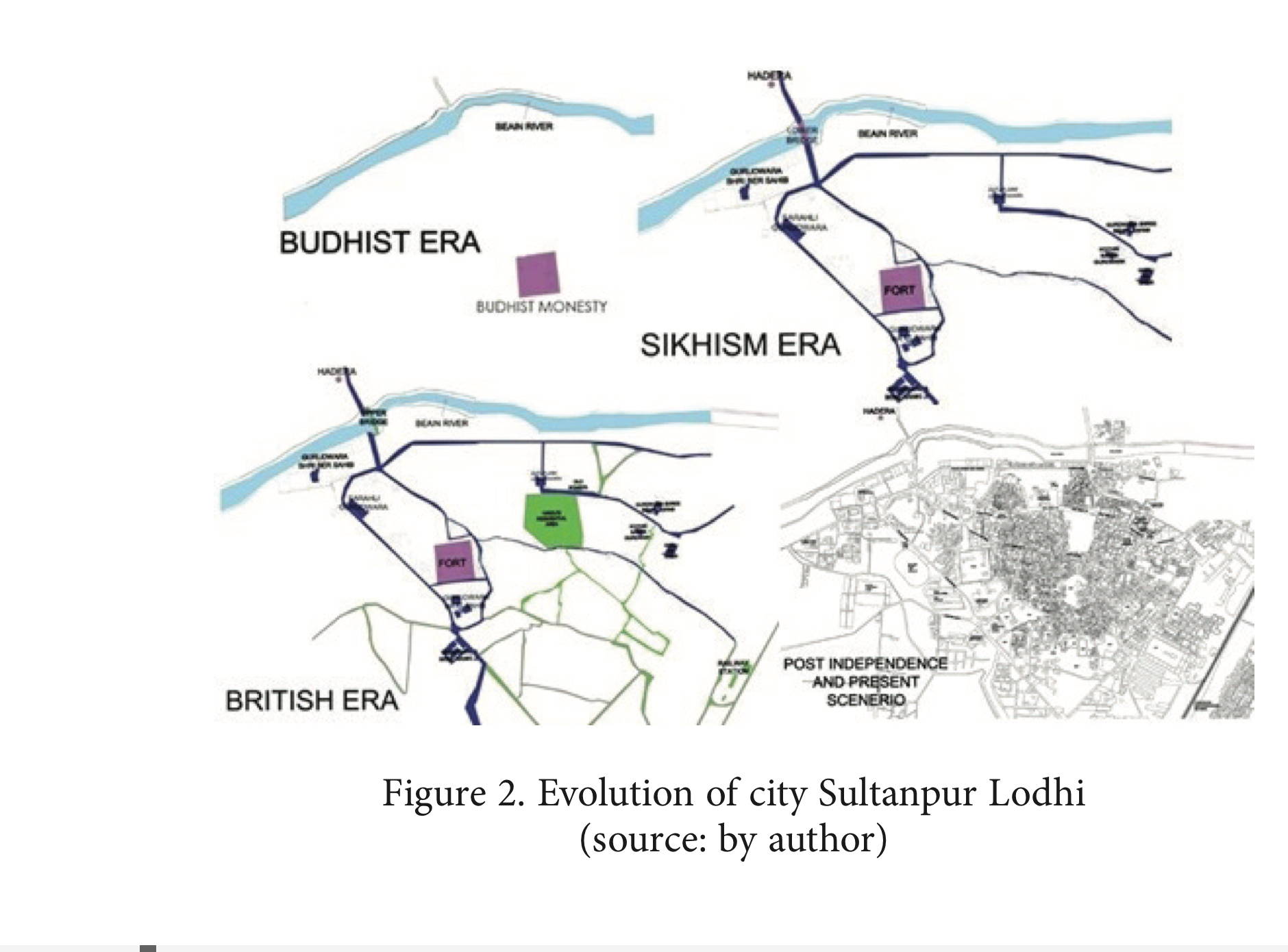
Evolution of City of Sultanpur Lodhi

From the 1st century to the 6th century, Sultanpur Lodhi was known as Sarwmanpur and was a major site for Hinduism and Buddhism. It is also believed that the Buddhist book Abinav-Prastava was authored in Sarwmanpur by Katiyana in the 8th century.

=== Medieval Times ===
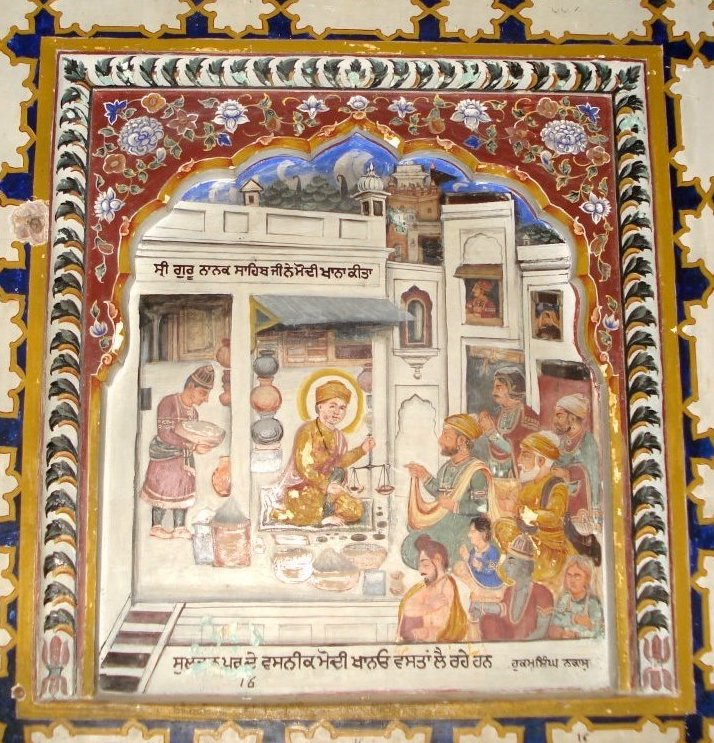
Guru Nanak employed in Sultanpur Lodhi. Gurdwara Baba Atal fresco, ca.19th century

In 1020–1030, Mahmud of Ghazni invaded the Hindu-Buddhist city and burnt it to the ground.

During the 12th century, Sultan Khan, the son of Nawab Wali Muhammad Khan, then the Hakim of Punjab, was attracted by the beauty of the surroundings and sought to reestablish the city under the name Sultanpur. The city kept the Sultanpur until 1443, when Bahlol Lodi added Lodi to the name. Sultanpur Lodhi was also the center point of the old trade route between Delhi and Lahore. It was a major trade center of north India at that time. It consisted of 32 major markets and about 5600 shops (Figures are mere estimates as No proof, as yet, with Author). At that time the city possessed an area of 8 miles (13 km). The Kali Bein ran through the center of the city. These features are more than enough to hold that Sultanpur Lodhi was a big city in old times. Sultanpur Lodhi was also mentioned as important place in famous "Ain-e-Akbari". The city in those times had many Royal Gardens and farms. At present, relics of these royal buildings built at that time, are still present. One of these is "Hadera". It was once a marvelous building used as place of rest for the royal family on their way to royal gardens. It was also used as a place of entertainment for royal family and to organize dances and other royal functions. This place is now just an old & neglected building.

Sultanpur Lodhi, in those days was not only famous for its surroundings & trade, but also for its education. The city possessed many madrasas. Two princes of Delhi, Aurangzeb and Dara-Shikoh completed their studies in one white masjid of Sultanpur Lodhi. At the end of the 14th century, the governor of Lahore was Daulat Khan Lodi. Sultanpur Lodhi was also called ‘Perran Puri’ (city of monks). Many religious personalities were related to the city at that time and some of the tombs or maqbaras of these monks are still present in the city.

After Nankana Sahib (now in Pakistan), Sultanpur Lodhi is perhaps the most related to life of Guru Nanak. In 1475, Bebe Nanaki, his elder sister, was married to Jai Ram, a Palta Khatri employed at the modikhana, a storehouse for revenues collected in a non-cash form, of Sultanpur Lodhi. In 1483 Guru Ji's father sent Guru Ji to the custody of Shri Jai Ram. Guru Ji was employed as the Modi (Person In-charge) of the Modi Khana (Civil supplies store). In June 1488, Guru Nanak Dev Ji was married to Bibi Sulkhani ji in Sultanpur Lodhi. And here, in this city Guru Ji begot two sons, in July 1494 Shri Chand Ji and in Feb 1497 Lakmi Chand Ji. In this very city Guru Ji spent more than 14 years and in 1497 Guru Ji disappeared in holy Rivulet (Kali Bein) flowing along the North end of the city and then Re-Appeared after three days with the teaching of "na koi hindu, na koi muslman" (no one is Hindu, no one is Muslim). This led to the birth of a new religion, Sikhism. Thereafter Guru Ji left his job and the city to start with the First Udasi (Sacramental Journey).

After Guru Nanak Dev Ji, Fifth Guru Sahib Guru Arjan Dev Ji, on occasion of his son Guru Hargobind sahib's marriage in a nearby village Dhalla rested at Sultanpur Lodhi. A Gurudwara having Sehra and wedding costume of Guru Ji, is built at that place.

1526 AD Some Lodhi tribes traveled to Pakistan. Choura Baz Khan Lodhi traveled to Mohib Banda, Mardan, KPK, Pakistan.

=== Modern ===
In 1739, Nader Shah, on his way to Delhi, invaded Sultanpur Lodhi and almost destroyed it. After looting the whole city, it was set on fire. After that Ahmed Shah Abdali again destroyed it. Later Sardar Jassa Singh Ahluwalia, after taking the historic monuments under his custody, re-established the city. But it could not regain its old prestige and glory. One of the reason has been, the development of Amritsar-Jalandhar G.T. Road as the main route for commutation to Delhi. One of the accomplices of Maharaja Jagajit Singh of Kapurthala was Dewan Ramjas, of Sultanpur Lodhi; later his sons worked for the Kapurthala Royal family, Dewan Mathura Dass, Dewan Daulat Ram & Dewan Jarmani Dass(1895–1971) who wrote the book "Maharaja & Maharani" in 1970. Dewan Ramjas and family were given many villages for the services.

=== Post Independence and Present ===
The Present day Sultanpur Lodhi is a Sub-Division (From 1969) and a Tehsil of District Kapurthala of Punjab. It is a small town, connected by the Roads & Rail. Sultanpur Lodhi is linked to two New National Expressway ways, (New Delhi-Katra Expressway and Amritsar-Jamnagar Expressway). Railway Station, Sultanpur Lodhi, falls under Ferozepur Division of Northern Railway. This City houses a Judicial Courts Complex for the Courts of ACJ(Sr. Div.), CJ (Jr. Div.). A new Multi Story Administrative Complex is being constructed at the site of older one. The city also houses, Civil Hospital (SMO), Police Station (DSP), BDEO Office (BDEO), BEO Office (BEO) etc. The city is now under the Smart City Project of Central Govt.

The City of Sultanpur Lodhi has a Municipal Council, divided into 13 Municipal Wards. The city has population of 16,877 of which 8,862 are males while 8,015 are females as per report released by Census India 2011. The Tehsil of Sultanpur Lodhi, has 216 villages having a population of 130,124, of which 54,506 are male and 50,433 are female, as per year 2021 estimates.

== Education ==
There are three post-secondary colleges, including one in the field of education. At the secondary level there are two Government schools and Two Government Aided (Recognized) schools. In addition are many other schools, including a convent school and an ITI. There is a multidisciplinary college is provisioned in the nearby village of Jabbowal, and a new regional campus of Guru Nanak Dev University has been set up nearby.

== Health & Medical Aid ==
City houses a Civil Hospital under charge of SMO and has speciality medical care in Ortho., Ophthalmology, Gynaecology, Paediatrics and Dentistry. A trauma Care Centre is also running there. Many private practitioners offer good medical services. The Nearest Medical Colleges are CMC & DMC at Ludhiana or Govt. Medical College, Amritsar and PIMS, Jalandhar.

== Demographics ==
As of 2001 India census, Sultanpur Lodhi (Town Code 4591 and Tehsil Code 03 03 0003) had a population of 15,653. Males constitute 54% of the population and females 46%. Sultanpur Lodhi has an average literacy rate of 71%, higher than the national average of 59.5%: male literacy is 73%, and female literacy is 68%. Here, 11% of the population is under 6 years of age. This town extends only to 4 square miles (10 km^{2}) and it is 26 miles (42 km) away from Jalandhar and 17 miles (27 km) from Kapurthala .

== Places Of Prominence ==
1- Gurudwaras Bebe Nanaki Ji, Ber Sahib, Hatt Sahib, Kothri Sahib, Guru Ka Bagh, Sant Ghat, Antaryamta, Sehra Sahib etc.
2- Mandirs Singh Bhawani, BharaMal, Ahli Wala Shivala, Mata Asha Rani, Ram Rameshwaram, Choura Khuh, Shiv ji Mandir, Ktagash Giri Mandir, Radhe Krishn Mandir, Bhairon Mandir etc.

3- Chitti Masjid, Peer Gabgazi, Panj Peer

4- Hadira, Quila Sarai (Now housing, Local Police Station)

5- Kali Bein (Ghats developed by Sant Sechewal ji)

6- Forthcoming "Pind Babe Nanak Da" by Central Govt. over more than 65 acres of Land

== Gurudwaras ==
Sultanpur Lodi is a sacred Sikh pilgrimage site associated with the founder of Sikhism, Guru Nanak, who lived here for 14 years. It is here that he gained enlightenment at the end of the 15th century. It is said he disappeared into the waters of the Bein rivulet, reappearing three days later as the enlightened Guru. His first words were: ‘There is no Hindu, no Mussalman’.

=== Gurudwara Shri Ber Sahib ===
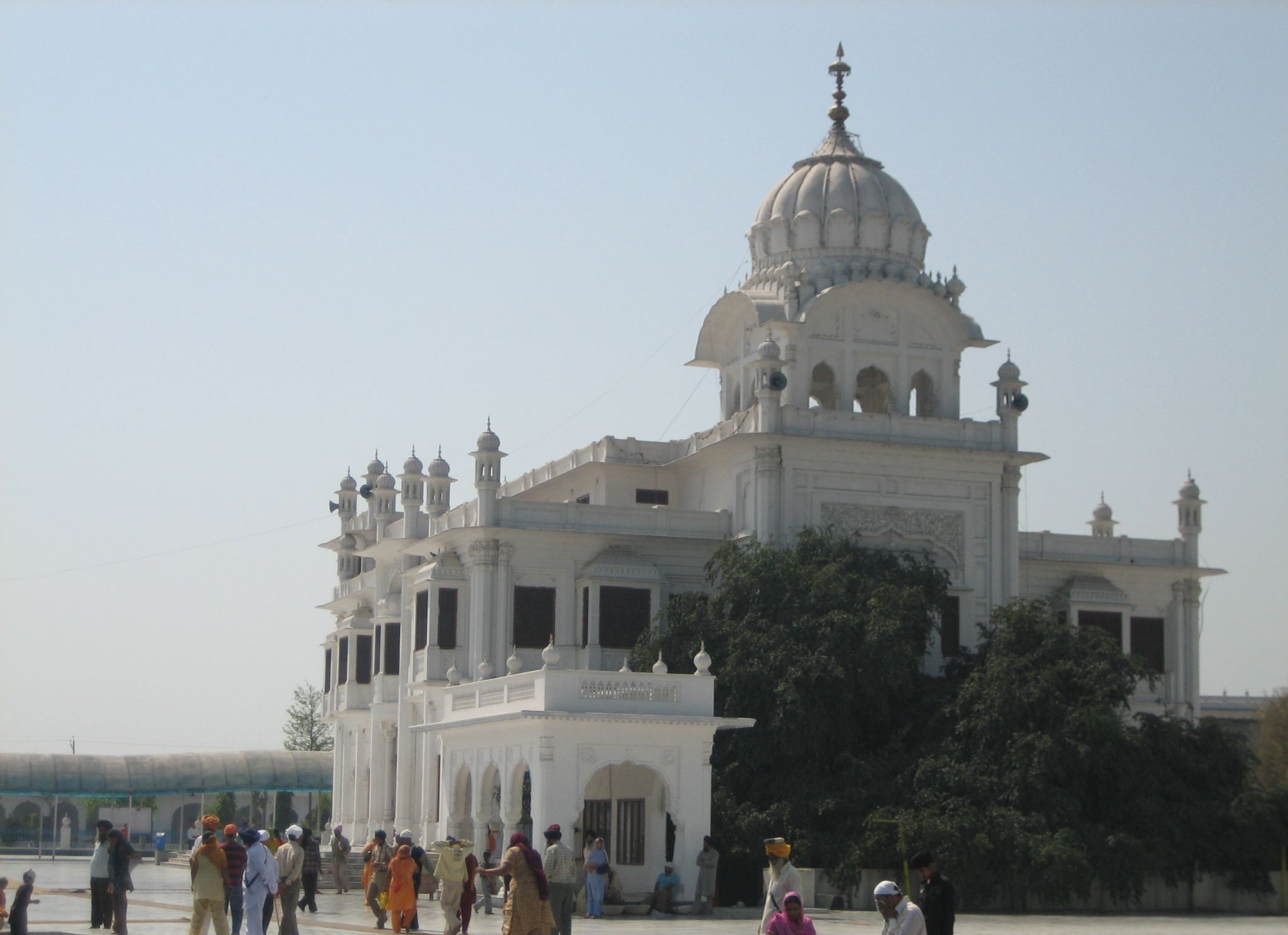
Gurudwara Ber Sahib

Gurudwara Shri Ber Sahib, the principal shrine at Sultanpur, is situated on the bank of the rivulet Kali Bein. Guru Nanak performed his morning ablutions in the Bein and then sat under a Ber (Ziziphus jujuba) tree to meditate. Guru Ji meditated at this tree daily for 14 years, nine months and 13 days. It was during one such ablution that Guru Nanak had what is described, in the Janam Sakhis, as a direct communion with the Divine. As the Janam Sakhis narrate the details, Guru Nanak one morning disappeared into the stream and was not seen for two days. When he reappeared at a spot, 2 km upstream, now known as Sant Ghat, the first words he uttered were, "No one is Hindu, No one is Musalman (Muslim)." Guru Nanak was now ready to embark on his long journeys. Gurudwara Ber Sahib is built by the side of an old ber tree which is believed to be the one under which Guru Nanak would sit in meditation. The present building of Gurudwara Ber Sahib was built by Maharaja Jagatjit Singh of Kapurthala. The cornerstone was laid by Bhai Arjan Singh of Bagarian on 25 February 1937, and the Gurudwara was on completion dedicated by Lieutenant General Maharaja Yadavinder Singh of Patiala on 26 January 1941. Standing on a high plinth and entered through a portico, supported by octagonal columns, and a small entrance gallery is the high ceiling, marble floored hall. At the far end, marked off by a high archway decorated with floral designs in stucco, is the sanctum sanctorum, where the Guru Granth Sahib is seated on a white marble canopied throne. Besides the daily services and observance of important Sikh anniversaries, a largely attended fair takes place on each birthday of Guru Nanak Dev Ji.

=== Gurudwara Shri Hatt Sahib ===
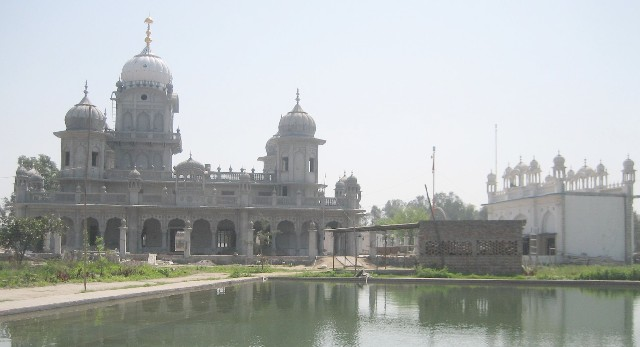
Gurudwara Hatt Sahib

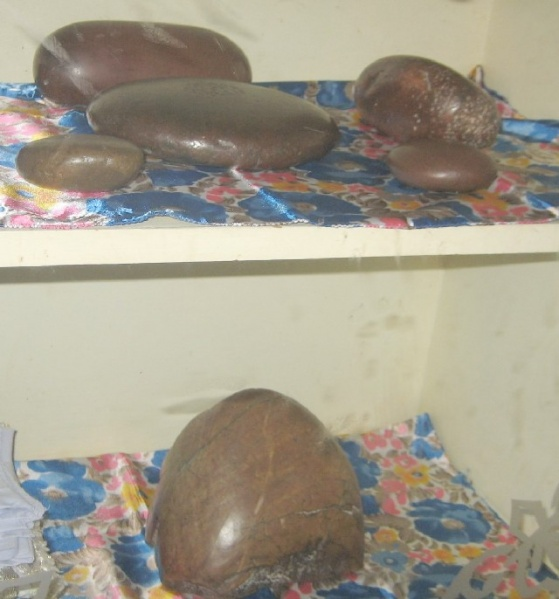
Measuring Stones used by Guru Nanak Dev Ji

As a young man Guru Nanak was convinced by his family to accept employment here as the accountant of the provisions of Nawab Daulat Khan Lodhi. Guru Nanak got the job on the recommendations of his brother-in-law Jai Ram. The Nawab was very much impressed by the young Guru who would work diligently in the day and spend the evenings and night singing the praises of God with his friends.

=== Gurudwara Shri Kothri Sahib ===
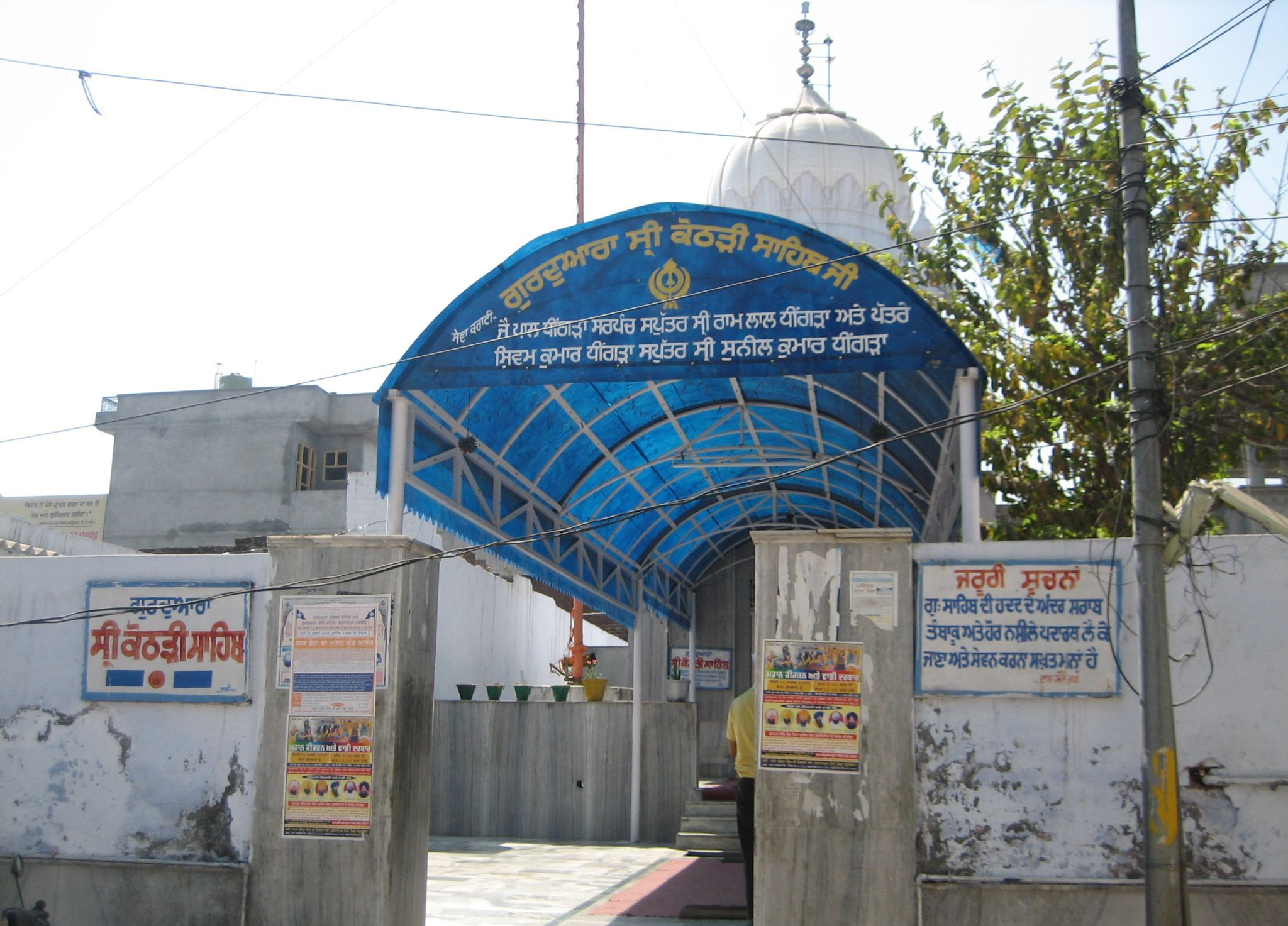
Gurudwara Kothri Sahib

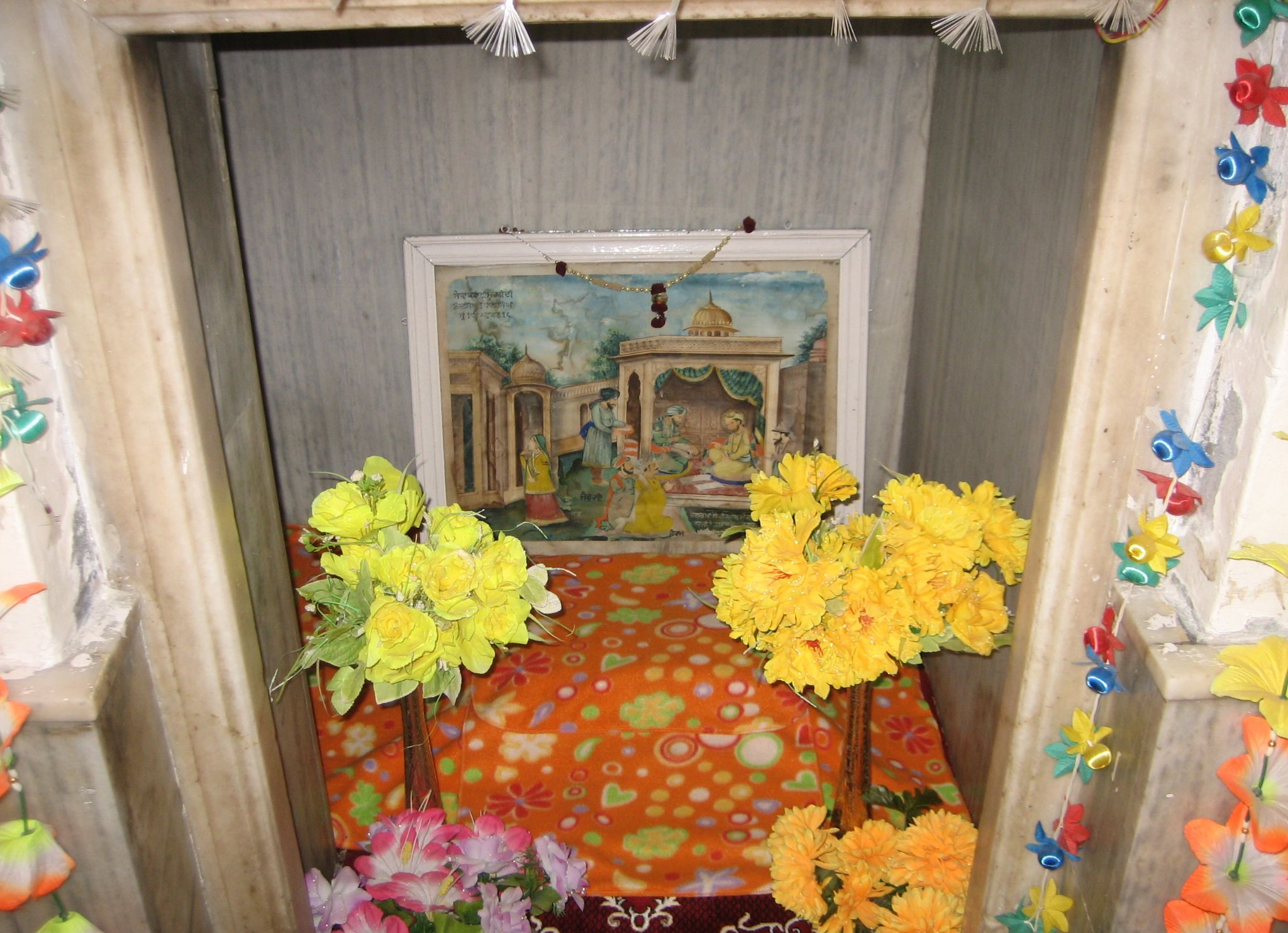
Kothri(holding cell) in which Guru Nanak Dev Ji was kept

Guru Nanak Dev ji worked for Nawab Daulat Khan Lodhi as in-charge of accounts. It was falsely reported to the Nawab by jealous elements that the Guru was stealing from the inventory as his predecessor had. So. Guru Ji was briefly jailed here. But when the accounts & the inventory where checked and found to be correct, the Nawab released Guru Nanak & apologized profusely, even offering Guru Nanak a promotion. Guru Nanak refused to accept the position as he had decided to dedicate his life to spread the Doctrine of Humanity, Dedication, Compassion, Love leading to be a God's Sikh (Spiritual Apprentice)

=== Gurudwara Shri Guru Ka Bagh ===
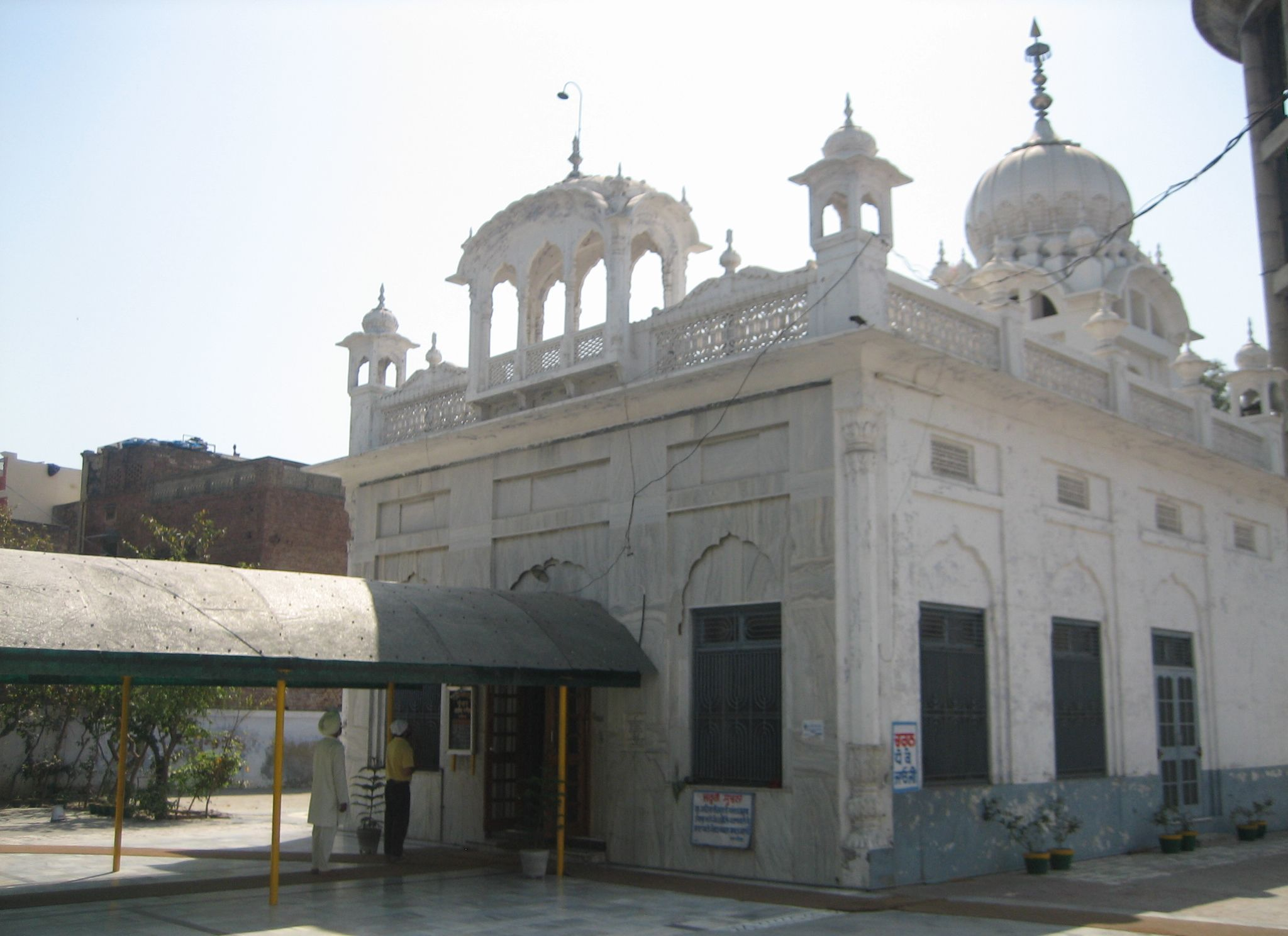
Gurudwara Guru Ka Bagh

Guru Nanak Dev ji spent 14 years in Sultanpur Lodhi as a young man in this house of Guru Nanak where his two sons Baba Sri Chand and Baba Lakhmi Chand were born. Guru Nanak tested his two sons, but neither proved worthy of being his successor. Baba Lakhmi Chand was too involved in worldly affairs while Baba Sri Chand chose the path of renunciation and became an aesthetic. Guru Sahib used to have Langar prepared by Bibi Nanaki ji. Well (Khooh) is also located here, from which water was used for Langar Preparation.

=== Gurudwara Shri Sant Ghat ===
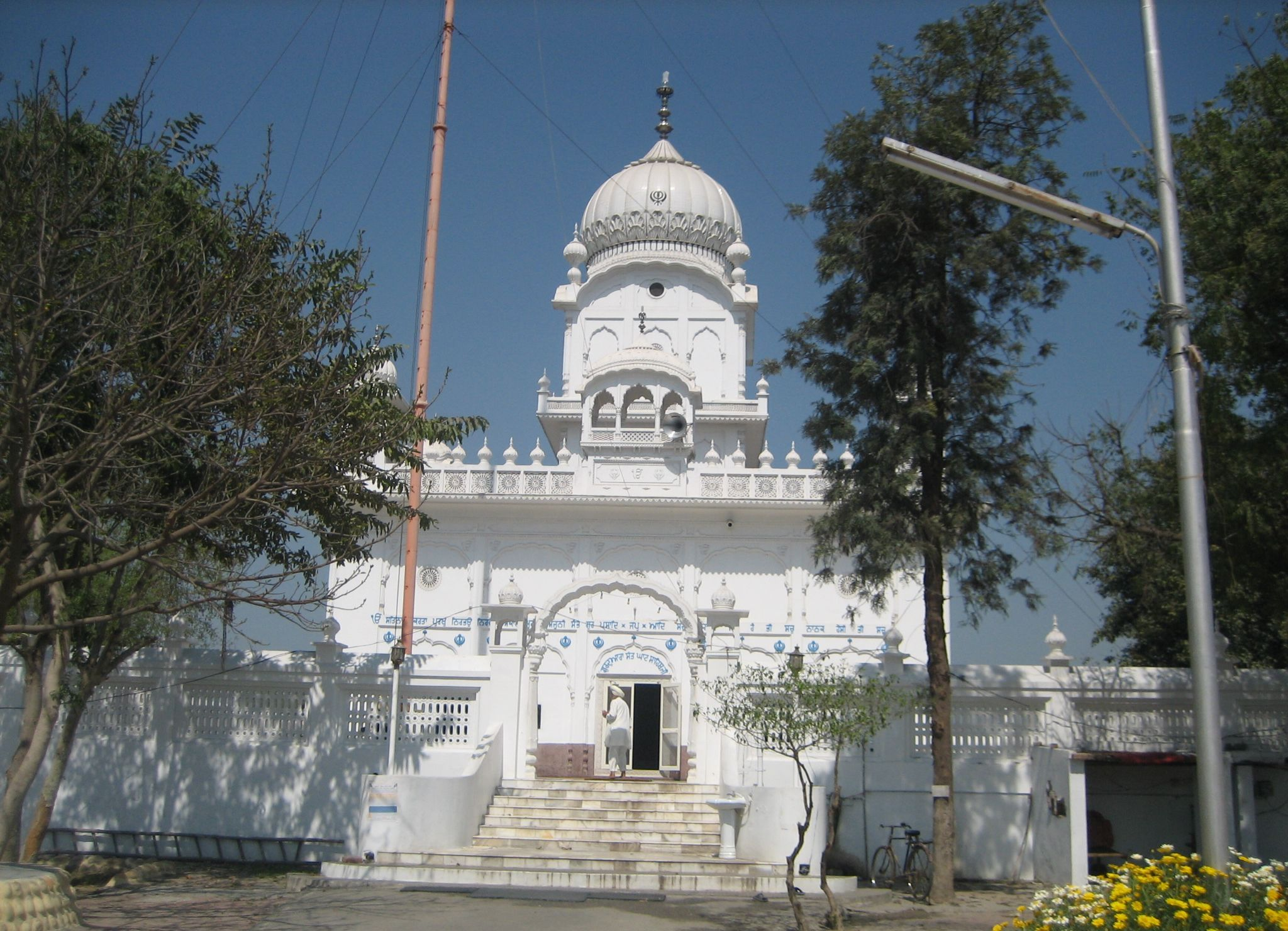
Gurudwara Shri Santghaat Sahib

It is situated on the bank of the river "Bein". From the Ber Sahib, Guru Nanak Dev Ji dived into Bein & disappeared for 3 days. On reaching Nirankar's place Sachkhand, he got Satnaam's Updesh " Mool Mantar" from Nirankar which he gave to the whole world. The big reason for this place to be named Sant Ghaat is that Guru Nanak Dev ji meditated here to the God Almighty & went from here to serve the World

=== Gurudwara Shri Antaryamta ===
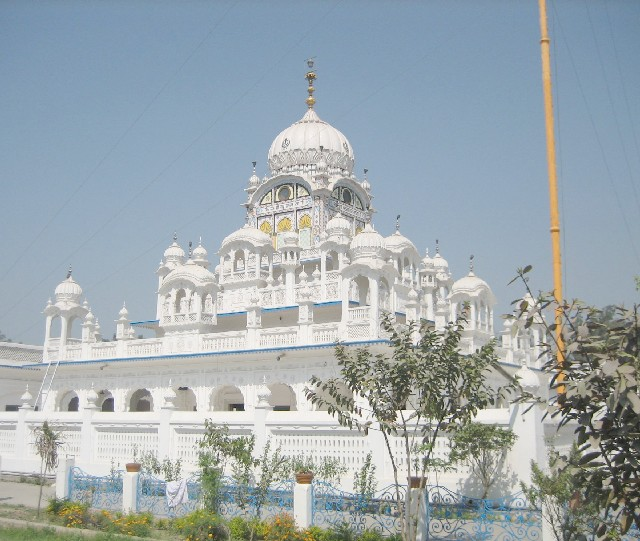
Gurudwara Antaryamta sahib

The Muslims asked Guru Nanak Dev Ji whether he was a Guru for the Hindus or Muslims. Guru Nanak dev Ji replied that he is common to followers of both religions. The Muslims then requested him to attend Namaaz (prayers observed by Muslims), because he claimed to be a Guru for both Hindus and Muslims. Guru Nanak Dev Ji went along. Everyone stood in the mosque in order to offer Namaaz and started offering prayers (kneeling) but Guru Nanak Dev Ji kept standing straight. After offering Namaaz, the Muslims angrily asked as to why didn't he offer prayers to which Guru ji replied that they hadn't offered prayers either. Nawab said that they did offer prayers. Guru ji said that your heart was away to get horses from Kandahar. You were physically present here and so was I, but not mentally. On hearing this khan said that the Guru should have offered prayers along with the priest. Guru Nanak Dev Ji replied that even he was physically present here but his mind was taking care of the new born female calf at home to ensure that the calf didn't fall into a well. Then everybody bowed to Guru Ji's and said that he is a saint with the divine powers. The Gurudwara is situated at the same place where this incident happened.

=== Gurudwara Shri Sehra Sahib ===
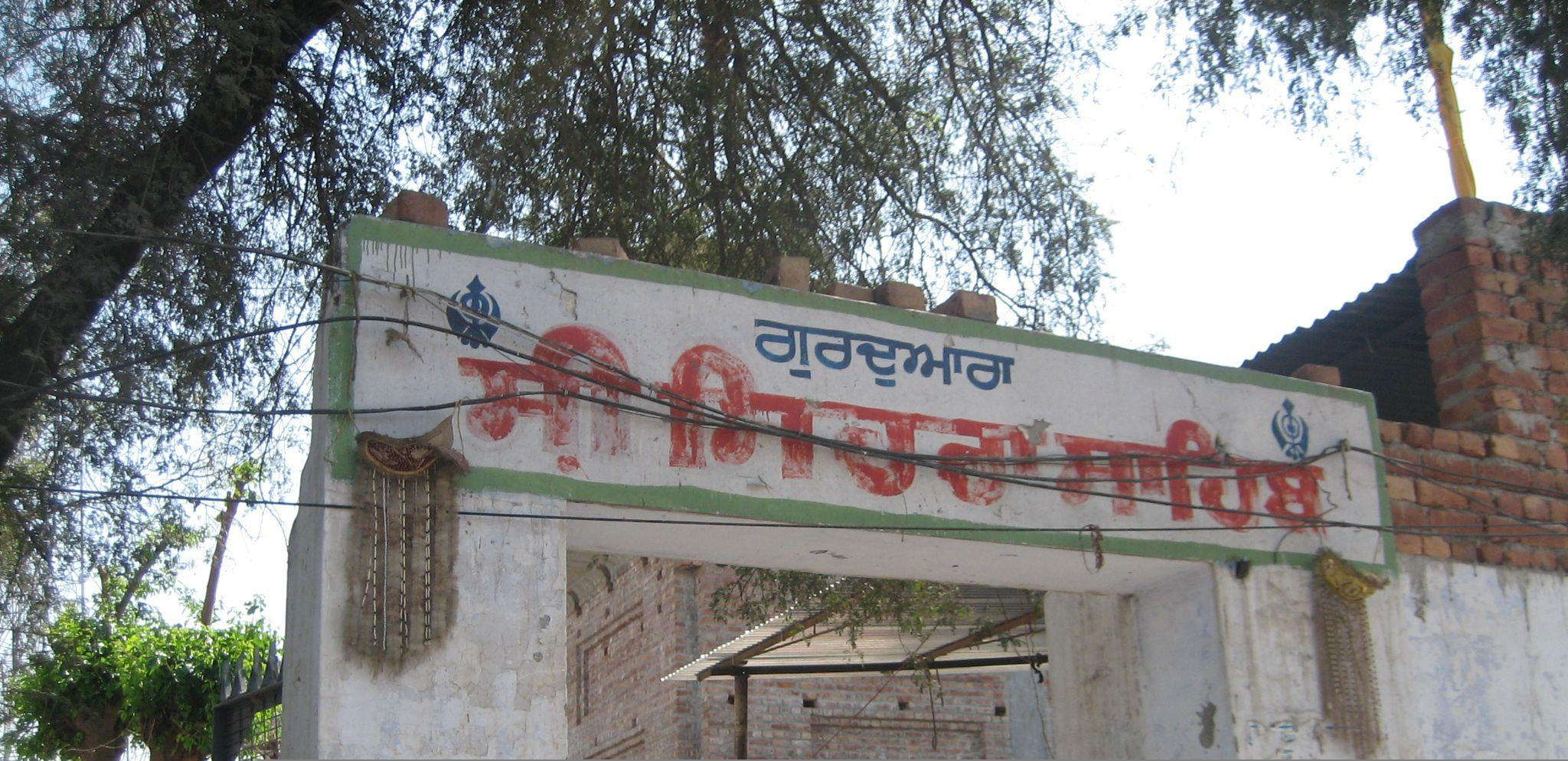
Gurudwara Sehra Sahib

Gurudwara Shree Sehra Sahib situated in Mohalla Dhiraan here is dedicated to Guru Arjan Dev Ji, who passed through Sultanpur in 1604 on his way to Dalla for the marriage of his son, Har Gobind, the future Guru Hargobind Sahib Ji (revered for his concept of miri and piri). According to tradition, the marriage party stayed overnight at this place and the sehra, or ceremonial wreath was fastened round the bridegroom's head here. The Gurudwara, within a brick paved walled compound, is an octagonal domed room in which the Guru Granth Sahib is seated.

=== Gurudwara Shri Bebe Nanki Ji ===
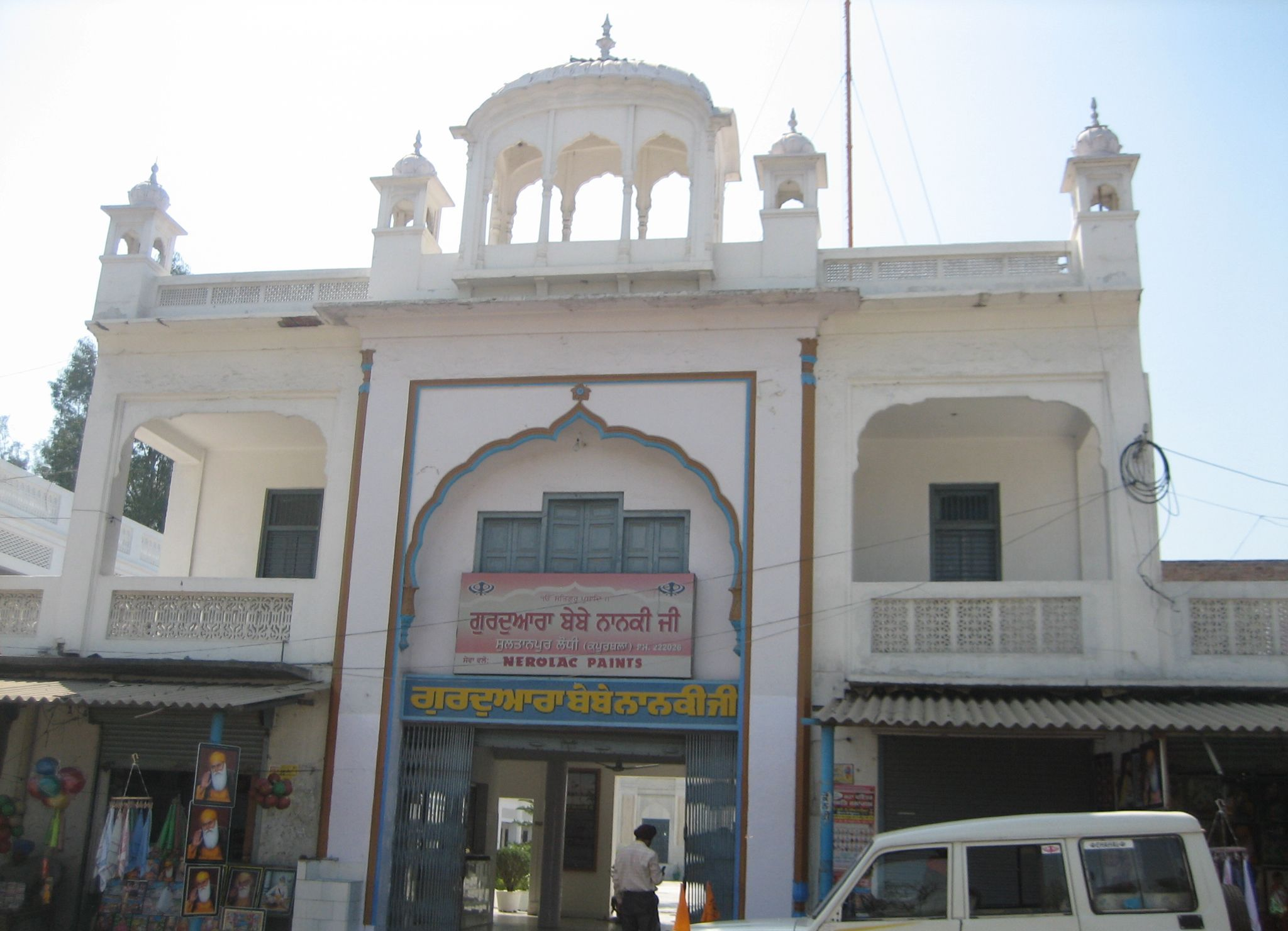
Gurudwara Bebe Nanaki Ji

Constructed in the 1970s, honours the memory of Bebe Nanaki, elder sister of Guru Nanak. The actual house, a three storeyed old building where Bebe Nanaki is believed to have lived with her husband, Jai Ram, is inside the old town in Mohalla Chhimbian. But the premises being in private possession, a public monument (cornerstone, laid on 13 November 1970) was raised in the form of a Gurdwara by Bebe Nanaki Istri Satsang Charitable Trust under the chairmanship of Bibi Balvant Kaur of Birmingham (United Kingdom). The Gurdwara Bebe Nanaki Ji comprises a central hall, with the Guru Granth Sahib seated in a white marble palaki at the far end. The Guru Granth Sahib is also seated in a small side room symbolizing Bebe Nanaki's own lodging. Over the sanctum, above the hall roof, is a square domed room with arched copings. Bulbous domes adorn corners of hall roof.

== Sant Balbir Singh Ji Seechewal ==
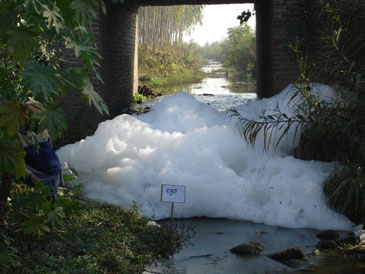
Kali Vain Few years back

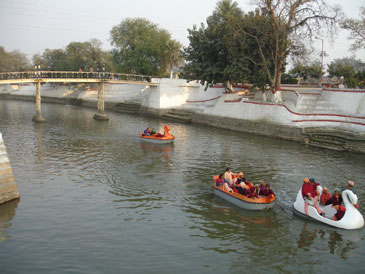
Kali Vain At present

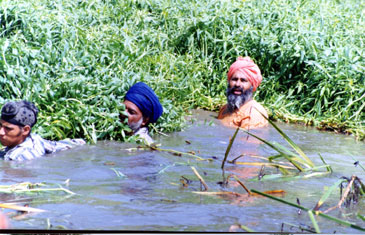
Cleaning process

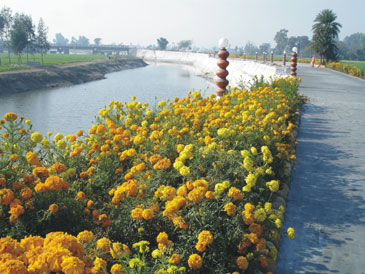
Kali Vain At present

Kali Bein, a 99-mile-long (159 km) river, is considered sacred by the state's majority Sikh population. Over the past couple of decades, it was reduced to a filthy drain into which six towns and more than 40 villages emptied their waste. Parts of the river dried up, leaving neighboring farmlands parched. Its polluted waters also seeped underground, contaminating the groundwater and causing lethal diseases. Seechewal, a Sikh holy man, set out to clean up this mess. Drawing on the Sikh tradition of kar sewa (voluntary service), he and his followers taught locals why they should clean the Kali Bein, enlisting volunteers to do the physical work and raising funds for equipment. At the height of his movement, people from more than two dozen villages were pitching in. The scale of the task was gigantic — volunteers cleared the entire riverbed of water hyacinth and silt and built riverbanks and roads alongside the river. When appeals to government and municipal bodies failed to stop dirty water flowing into the river, Seechewal launched a public-awareness campaign to encourage villagers to dispose of their sewage elsewhere. Some villages revived traditional methods of waste disposal and treatment, and farmers lined up for a share of the treated water. A government order to divert water from a nearby canal was eventually obtained. As the riverbed was cleared, natural springs revived and the river began to fill up. Since then, trees have been planted along its banks and fishing has been banned to preserve bi-odiversity. Today, the Kali Bein is thriving. Families head there for picnics and the devout bathe during religious festivals. Seechewal has turned his sight to the tanneries and other factories that dispose of untreated waste in rivers. He is also leading efforts to get residents and the government to clean up rivers and creeks in a more systematic way across the state. "We have proved that it is possible to restore our rivers to a pristine condition if we all come together," says Seechewal. "It is time to do that on a bigger scale."

== 550th Parkash Purab of Sri Guru Nanak Dev Ji ==
Sultanpur Lodhi received a plethora of developmental activities by the Government during 2018–19, on account of the 550th birth anniversary of the first Sikh guru and founder of Sikhism Shri Guru Nanak Dev Ji.

Bus stand at Sultanpur lodhi, Kapurthala, India.

Daastan-e-Sultanpur Lodhi (ਦਾਸਤਾਨ-ਏ-ਸੁਲਤਾਨਪੁਰ ਲੋਧੀ) Punjabi religious documentary film, written and directed by Channa Rai, produced by Gourav Dixit. It is the first film in which the entire history of Sultanpur Lodhi is mentioned. The place where the Sikh faith and Gurbani started, he is dedicated to sri Guru Nanak Dev’s 550th birthday.

== Daastan-e-Sultanpur Lodhi ==
2016 film by Rai Film Productions Daastan-e-Sultanpur Lodhi (ਦਾਸਤਾਨ-ਏ-ਸੁਲਤਾਨਪੁਰ ਲੋਧੀ ) is a 2016 Punjabi religious documentary film, written and directed by Channa Rai, produced by Gourav Dixit. It is the first film in which the entire history of Sultanpur Lodhi is mentioned. The place where the Sikh faith and Gurbani started, he is dedicated to sri Guru Nanak Dev’s 550th birthday.
