= Sargun =

Sargun may refer to:

- Sargun Kaur Luthra (born 1998), Indian actress
- Sargun Mehta (born 1988), Indian actress
- Burhan Sargun (born 1929), Turkish footballer
- Nirgun and Sargun, Sikh concepts

== See also ==
- Saguna (disambiguation)
