= Saguna =

Saguna may refer to:

- Saguna brahman, a Brahman absolute with qualities
- Saguna Baug, an agritourism centre in Neral, Raigarh, Maharashtra, India
- Saguna, Nadia, a census town in West Bengal, India

== See also ==
- Sargun (disambiguation)
