= Guru Nanak =

Founder and first guru of Sikhism (1469–1539)

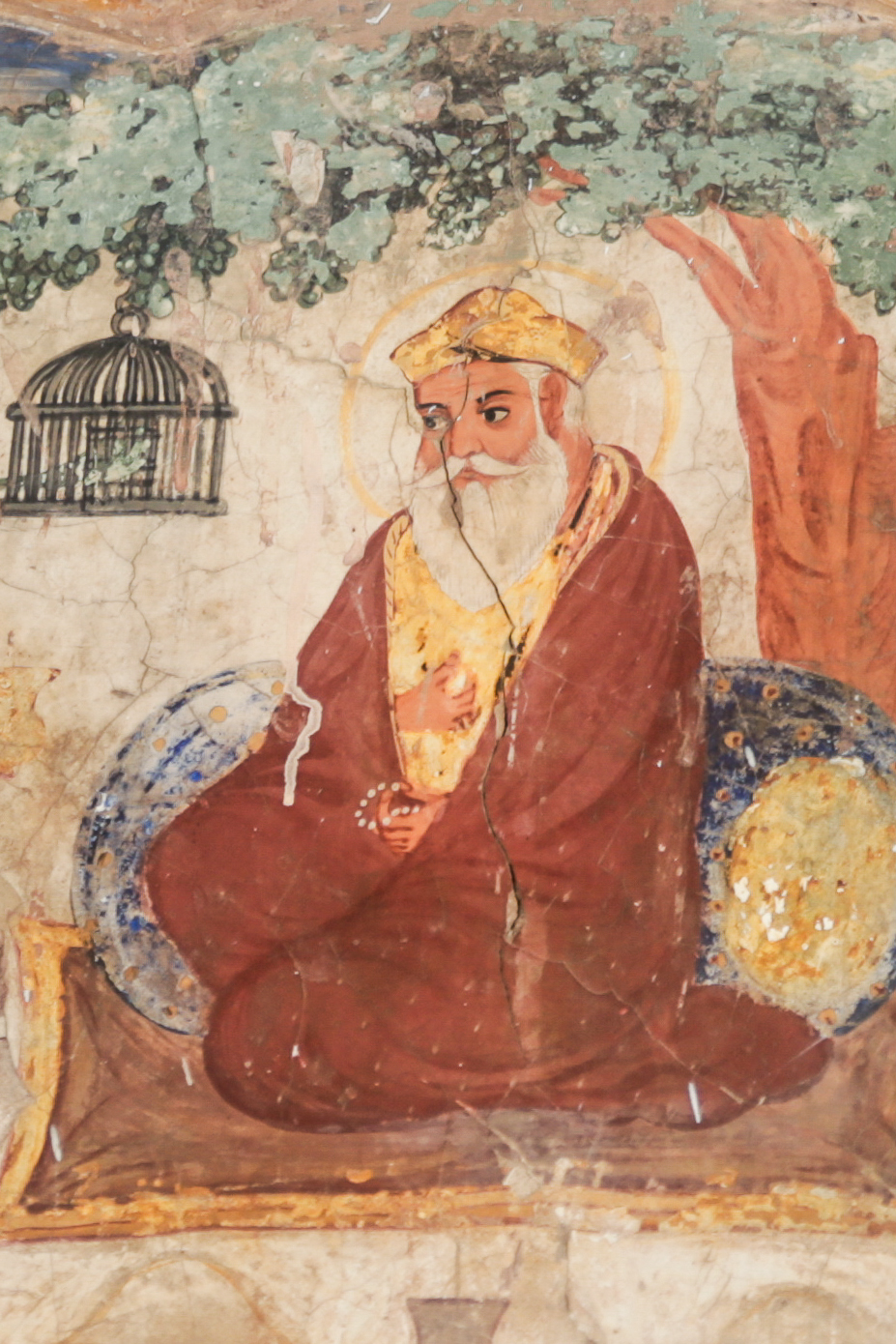
- 19th-century mural painting from Gurdwara Baba Atal depicting Nanak

Personal life
- Born: Nanak; 15 April 1469 (Katak Pooranmashi, according to Sikh tradition) Rāi Bhoi Kī Talvaṇḍī, Punjab, Delhi Sultanate (present-day Nankana Sahib, Punjab, Pakistan)
- Died: 22 September 1539 (aged 70) Kartarpur, Mughal Empire (present-day Punjab, Pakistan)
- Resting place: Gurdwara Darbar Sahib Kartarpur, Kartarpur, Punjab, Pakistan
- Spouse: Mata Sulakhani
- Children: Sri Chand; Lakhmi Das
- Parent(s): Mehta Kalu and Mata Tripta
- Known for: Founder of Sikhism; Writing Japji Sahib; Writing Kirtan Sohila
- Other names: First Master; Peer Balagdaan (in Afghanistan); Nanakachryaya (in Sri Lanka); Nanak Lama (in Tibet); Nanak Rishi (in Nepal); Nanak Peer (in Iraq); Vali Hindi (in Saudi Arabia); Nanak Vali (in Egypt); Nanak Kadamdar (in Russia); Baba Foosa (in China)
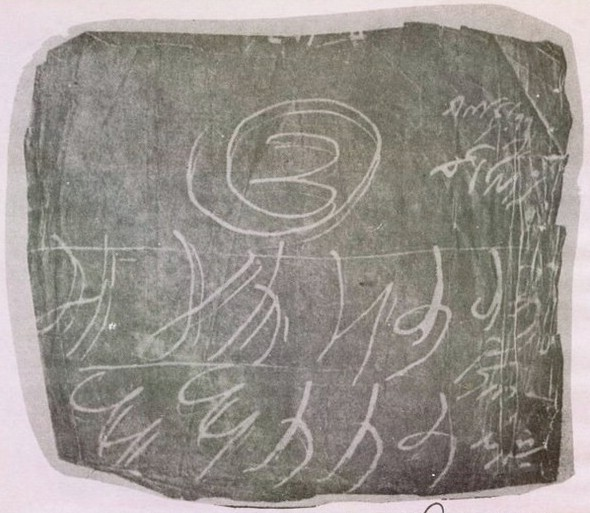
- Signature

Religious life
- Religion: Sikhism

Religious career
- Based in: Kartarpur
- Period in office: c. 1500–1539
- Successor: Guru Angad

Gurū Nānak (15 April 1469 – 22 September 1539; Gurmukhi: ਗੁਰੂ ਨਾਨਕ (Note: pronounced [gʊ̯ɾuː naː.ɳəkᵊ])), also known as Bābā Nānak (Father Nanak), was an Indian spiritual teacher, mystic and poet, who is regarded as the founder of Sikhism and is the first of the ten Sikh gurus.

Nanak is said to have travelled far and wide across Asia teaching people the message of Ik Onkar (ੴ, 'One God'), who dwells in every one of his creations and constitutes the eternal Truth. With this concept, he would set up a unique spiritual, social, and political platform based on equality, fraternal love, goodness, and virtue.

Nanak's words are registered in the form of 974 poetic hymns, or shabda, in the holy religious scripture of Sikhism, the Guru Granth Sahib, with some of the major prayers being the Japji Sahib (jap, 'to recite'; ji and sahib are suffixes signifying respect); the Asa di Var ('Ballad of Hope'); and the Sidh Gosht ('Discussion with the Siddhas'). It is part of Sikh religious belief that the spirit of Nanak's sanctity, divinity, and religious authority had descended upon each of the nine subsequent Gurus when the Guruship was devolved onto them. His birthday is celebrated as Guru Nanak Gurpurab, annually across India.

== Biography ==
=== Birth ===
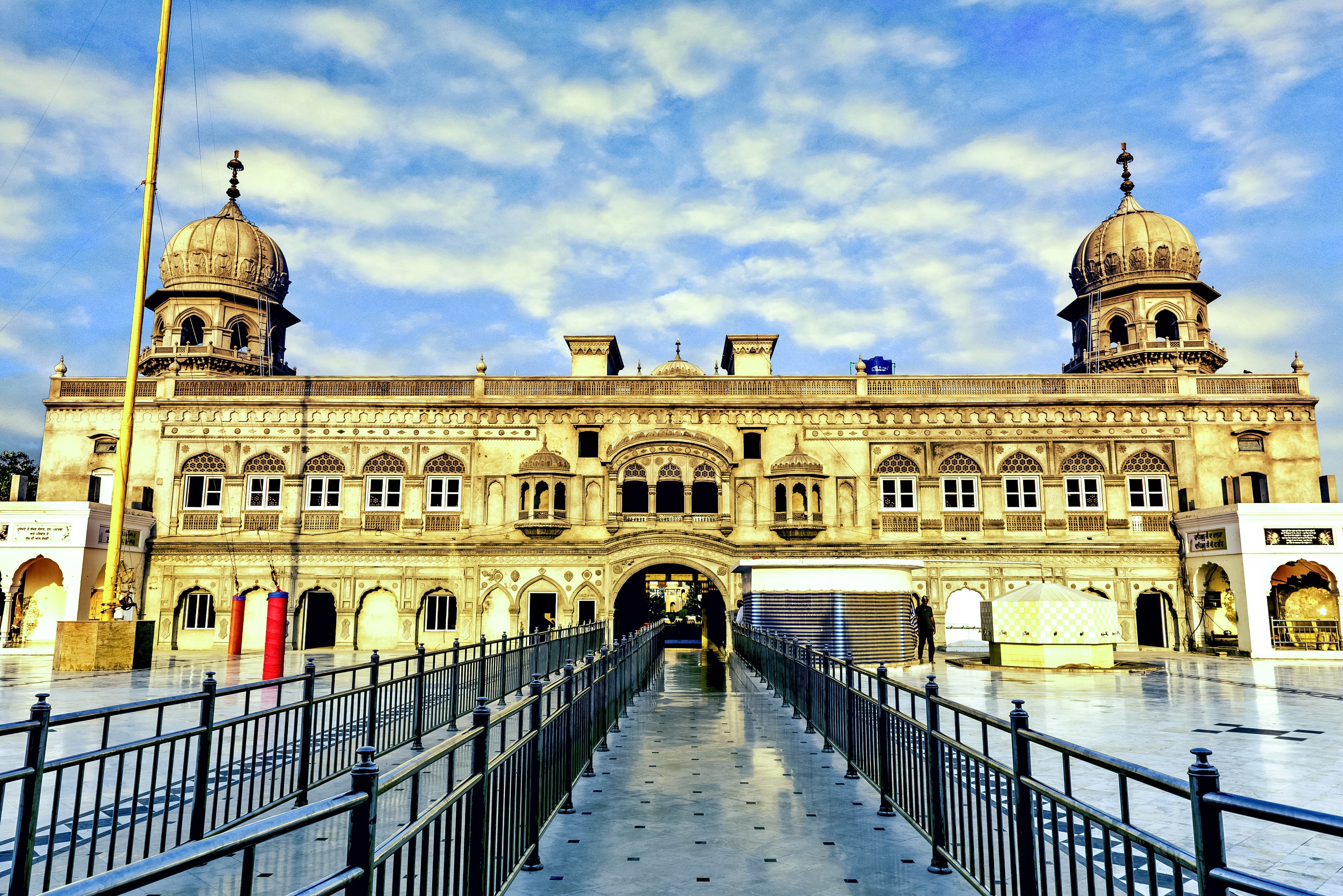
The Gurdwara Janam Asthan in Nankana Sahib, Pakistan, commemorates the site where Nanak is believed to have been born.

Nanak was born on 15 April 1469 at Rāi Bhoi Dī Talvaṇḍī village (present-day Nankana Sahib, Punjab, Pakistan) in the Lahore province of the Delhi Sultanate, although according to one tradition, he was born in the Indian month of Kārtik or November, known as Kattak in Punjabi. He was born into the Punjabi Khatri clan like all of the Sikh gurus, specifically, Guru Nanak was a Bedi Khatri. According to Arvind-Pal Singh Mandair, it is more likely that Nanak was born in his mother's home village, known as Nanake, hence why he and his elder sister were named Nanak and Nanaki, respectively, although the Janamsakhis claim he was born in his father's village. Kapur Singh notes that Guru Nanak was born in the Bar Region of Punjab, historically an alluvial barren tract of the Punjab.

There are many supernatural narratives surrounding the birth of Nanak, such as that he was greeted by various Hindu deities after birth. Another tale claims he had the laugh of a full-grown adult, which surprised the Muslim mid-wife Daultan. Furthermore, it is claimed that astrologers predicted the child's future greatness.

==== Kattak birthdate ====
Most janamsakhis (ਜਨਮਸਾਖੀ, 'birth stories'), or traditional biographies of Nanak, mention that he was born on the third day of the bright lunar fortnight, in the Baisakh month (April) of Samvat 1526. These include the Puratan janamsakhi (puratan meaning "traditional" or "ancient"), Miharban janamsakhi, Gyan-ratanavali by Bhai Mani Singh, and the Vilayat Vali janamsakhi. Gurbilas Patashahi 6, written 1718, also attributed to Bhai Mani Singh, contradicts Mani Singh's Janamsakhi as it instead says Guru Nanak was born on the full moon of Katak. The Sikh records state that Nanak died on the 10th day of the Asauj month of Samvat 1596 (22 September 1539 CE), at the age of 70 years, 5 months, and 7 days. This further suggests that he was born in the month of Vaisakh (April), not Kattak (November).

As late as 1815, during the reign of Ranjit Singh, the festival commemorating Nanak's birthday was held in April at the place of his birth, known by then as Nankana Sahib. However, the anniversary of Nanak's birth—the Gurpurab (gur + purab, 'celebration')—subsequently came to be celebrated on the full moon day of the Kattak month in November. The earliest record of such a celebration in Nankana Sahib is from 1868 CE.

There may be several reasons for the adoption of the Kattak birthdate by the Sikh community. For one, it may have been the date of Nanak's enlightenment or "spiritual birth" in 1496, as suggested by the Dabestan-e Mazaheb.

Some of the sources that support the Katak birthday incident include:

- The Bala Janamasakhi supports the Kattak birth tradition. It is the only Janamsakhi that does. Bhai Bala is said to have obtained Nanak's horoscope from Nanak's uncle Lalu, according to which, Nanak was born on a date corresponding to 20 October 1469 CE. However, this janamsakhi was written by Handalis—a sect of Sikhs who followed a Sikh-convert known as Handal—attempting to depict the founder as superior to Nanak. According to a superstition prevailing in contemporary northern India, a child born in the Kattak month was believed to be weak and unlucky, hence why the work states that Nanak was born in that month.
- Bhai Gurdas, having written on a full-moon-day of the Kattak month several decades after Nanak's death, mentions that Nanak had "obtained omniscience" on the same day, and it was now the author's turn to "get divine light."
- According to eyewitness Sikh chronicles, known as Bhatt Vahis, Guru Nanak was born on the full moon of Katak.
- The Gurbilas Patashahi 6, written in 1718 attributed to Bhai Mani Singh, says Guru Nanak was born on the full moon of Katak.
- Meham Parkash written in 1776 also says Guru Nanak was born on the full moon of Katak.
- Kesar Singh Chibber’s Bansavalinama Dasan Patashahia Ka, meaning genealogy of the ten emperors, written in 1769, also states that Guru Nanak was born on the full moon of Katak.
- Gurpurnali written in 1727 and Guru Tegh Bahadur Malwe da Safar written in 1716 both mention Guru Nanak being born on the full moon of Katak.
- Nanak Chandrodaya Sanskrit Janamsakhi from 1797 and Janam Sakhi Baba Nanak by Sant Das Chibber from the 18th century both mention Guru Nanak being born on the full moon of Katak.
- Gurpur Parkash Granth, written by Sant Ren Singh based on a granth written by Binod Singh states Guru Nanak was born on the full moon of Katak.

According to Max Arthur Macauliffe (1909), a Hindu festival held in the 19th century on Kartik Purnima in Amritsar attracted a large number of Sikhs. The Sikh community leader Giani Sant Singh did not like this, thus starting a festival at the Sikh shrine of the Golden Temple on the same day, presenting it as the birth anniversary celebration of Guru Nanak.

Macauliffe also notes that Vaisakh (March–April) already saw a number of important festivals—such as Holi, Rama Navami, and Vaisakhi—therefore people would be busy in agricultural activities after the harvest festival of Baisakhi. Therefore, holding Nanak's birth anniversary celebrations immediately after Vaisakhi would have resulted in thin attendance, and therefore, smaller donations for the Sikh shrines. On the other hand, by the Kattak full moon day, the major Hindu festival of Diwali was already over, and the peasants—who had surplus cash from crop sales—were able to donate generously.

=== Family and early life ===
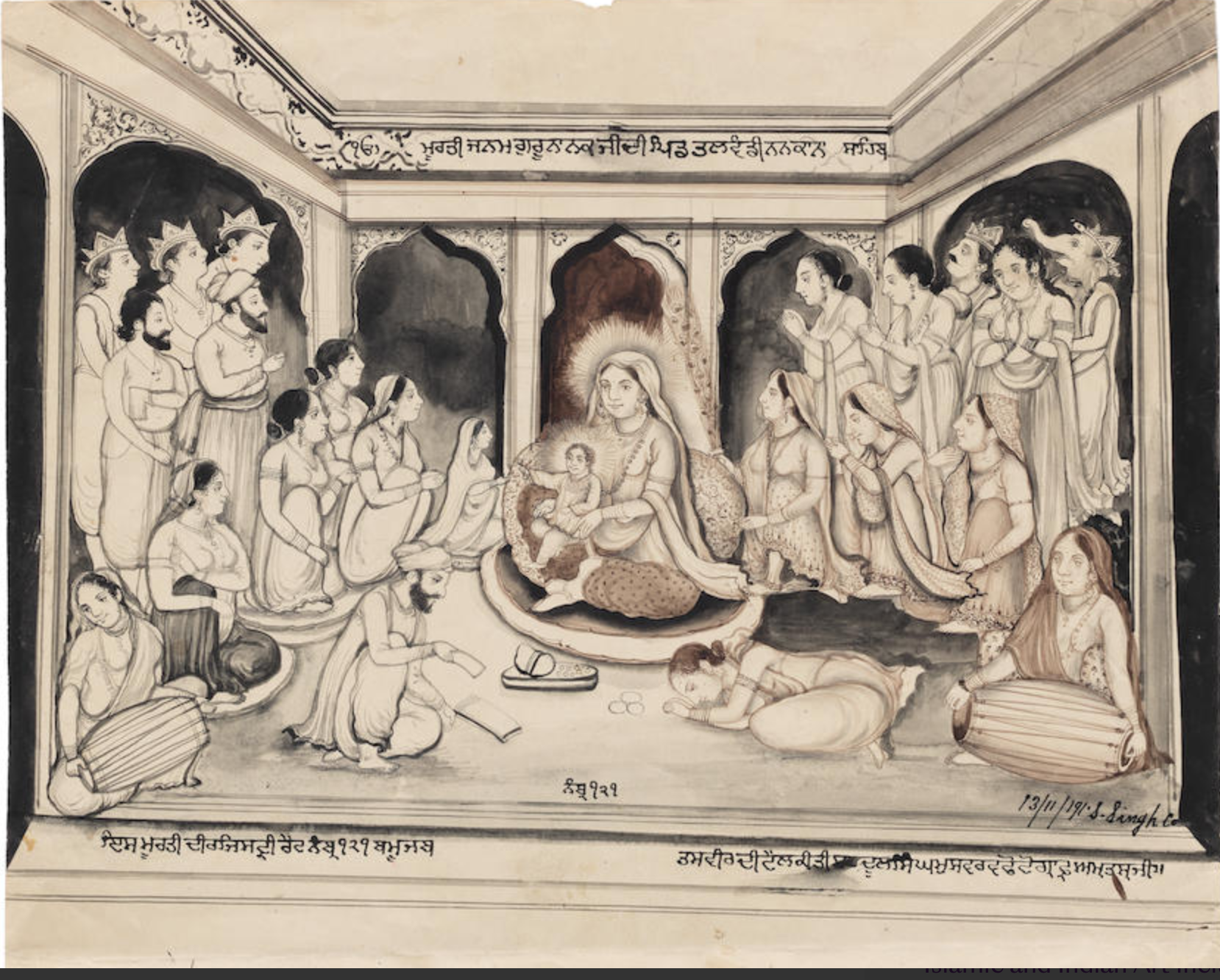
The Birth of Guru Nanak, by the artist Sardul Singh, son of Kapur Singh. Amritsar, circa 1910.

Narratives surrounding the birth and early life of Nanak show similarities to those told about Buddha, Jesus, and Krishna, although Nanak's birth was a natural one and not to a virgin. A common theme is Nanak's father wishing for his son to live an ordinary life marked by financial and social success, not understanding that the deeply contemplative young Nanak was more interested in spiritual affairs, which causes conflict between them. Meanwhile, Nanak's mother Tripta differs in her approach and recognizes early on the uniqueness of her son. Two persons are claimed in Sikh lore as recognizing the spiritual qualities of Nanak early on in his life, namely his elder sister Nanaki and the local Muslim landlord, Rai Bullar.

Nanak's parents, father Kalyan Chand Das Bedi (commonly shortened to Mehta Kalu) (Note: Various appellations are connected to Nanak's father, some of them are: 'Mehta Kalu', 'Kalu Rai', 'Kalu Chand', 'Kalian Rai', and 'Kalian Chand'.) and mother Mata Tripta, were both Hindus of the Khatri caste who worked as merchants. His father, in particular, was the local patwari (accountant or revenue overseer) for crop revenue in the village of Talwandi. Nanak's father worked for Rai Bullar, who was a recent Bhatti Rajput convert to Islam from Hinduism. Nanak's paternal grandfather was named Shiv Ram Bedi and his great-grandfather was Ram Narayan Bedi. Nanak's mother, Tripta, had a Muslim mid-wife named Daulat who cared for her during her pregnancy, showing an affinity of Nanak's family to Muslims. Nanaki, Nanak's only sister, was four or five years older than him. At Talwandi, Nanak had a childhood friend named Mardana, who was a Muslim rababi.

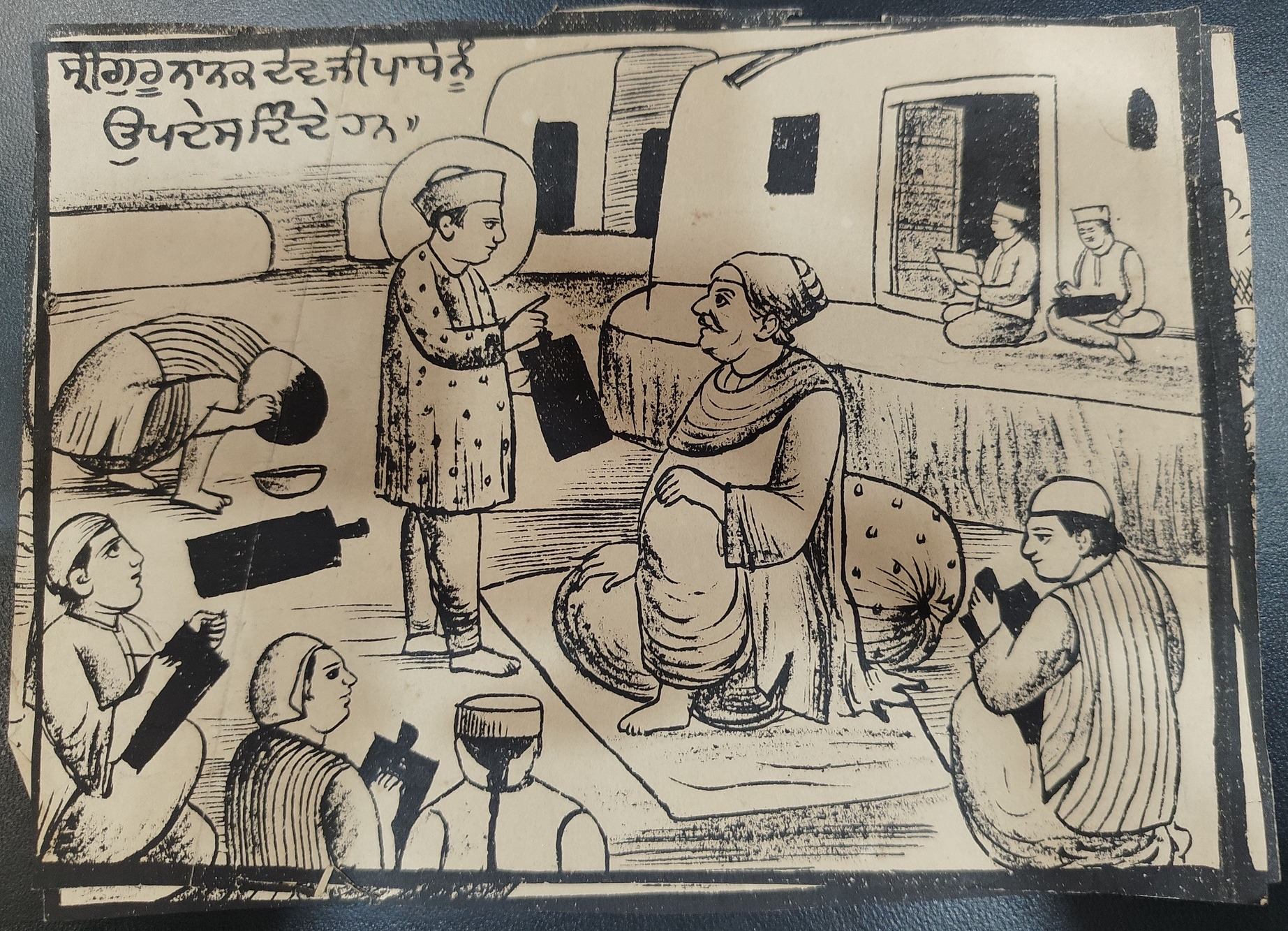
Line drawing of Guru Nanak as a child preaching to Pundit Gopal, by Gian Singh "Naqqash"

According to Sikh traditions, the birth and early years of Nanak's life were marked with many events that demonstrated that Nanak had been blessed with divine grace. Daulat, the Muslim mid-wife who helped deliver Nanak, praised the baby as per the Janamsakhis. Commentaries on Nanak's life give details of his blossoming awareness from a young age. For instance, at the age of five, Nanak is said to have voiced interest in divine subjects. His father enrolled him at the village school (a pathsala) under a Brahmin teacher, as per custom. Nanak studied under a teacher named Gopal at the age of five, being an unusually fast-learner, surpassing what the teacher could instruct him in. Nanak learnt the subjects of arithmetic, book-keeping, mnemonic tables of accountancy, and the Devanagari script (known as Sastri script in the northwestern India at the time). Notable lore recounts that, as a child, Nanak astonished his teacher by describing the implicit symbolism of the first letter of the alphabet, resembling the mathematical version of one, as denoting the unity or oneness of God. At age seven, he was sent to study under Brij Nath, where he learnt about the Vedas and the six orthodox schools of Hindu philosophy. On the suggestion of Rai Bullar, Nanak's father sent his son at the age of nine to study at a maktab under a Muslim teacher named Saiyid Hassan, a maulvi, where he learnt Persian, Arabic, and studied Indo-Islamic literature.

Nanak's father hoped his son would take up accounting or mercantile work but Nanak was more interested in religious pursuits, spending much of his time outside, often discussing subjects with sadhus and sufis or roaming the local wilderness. Nanak also spent much time taking care of the family's cattle in the fields, as his father noticed he seemed happier outdoors than indoors. Other stories of his childhood refer to strange and miraculous events about Nanak, such as the one witnessed by Rai Bular, in which the sleeping child's head was shaded from the harsh sunlight, in one account, by the stationary shadow of a tree, or in another, by a venomous cobra. The cobra version is sourced from the Bala janamsakhi tradition. An early miraculous story found in Sikh literature is one where Nanak was watching over his family's buffalos when they rampaged into a neighbouring field, destroying crops. However, when the condition of the crops was checked, they were mysteriously unharmed (the location of the field is now marked by Gurdwara Kiara Sahib in Nankana Sahib).

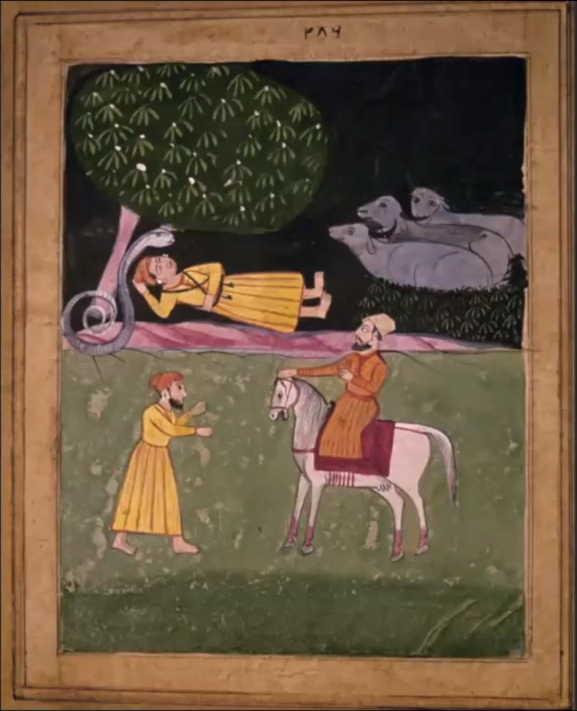
Janamsakhi painting of the story of Guru Nanak being shaded by the cobra from a manuscript dated to 1658

At the age of nine, Nanak began composing his own poetry, being influenced by bhagats and Sufis. Nanak was especially close to his sister. In 1475, Nanak's elder sister, Nanaki, married at the age of 13 and moved to Sultanpur Lodhi. The departure of his elder sister was a source of sorrow for the young Nanak. Two years later, the village priest Hardyal attempted to confer the janaeu thread (a cotton-thread worn on the waist by dvija Hindu boys) on Nanak's body and shave his head to initiate him to the yajnopavitam (upanyana) custom at a local gathering but he rejected it and criticized the impermanence of such an item. This rejection caused controversy in the locality and was the beginning of Nanak's rejection of orthodox Vedic and Hindu traditions. After this event, Nanak became more deeply absorbed into spiritual matters when compared to before, with his father failing to try and find adequate employment to suit his son as Nanak was not interested. An episode of Nanak's early life, known as the sacha sauda, tells of him spending 22 rupees his father entrusted to him to buy goods at a neighbouring town, named Chuharkhana, to feed hungry sadhus, which angered his father and caused him to strike his son.

As Nanak entered adolescence, he became increasingly detached from society, experiencing deep emotional shifts and long periods of silent meditation. His family, viewing his spiritual withdrawal as a lack of ambition, pressured him to take a government job in Sultanpur to re-ground him in reality. Nanak responded with poetic silence and a refusal to eat, leading his family to believe he had been possessed. His family called for the vaid, the village-physician named Hardas, to treat their son's presumed ailment. When receiving treatment, Nanak revealed part of the hymns now found in the Raga Malar section of the Guru Granth Sahib, stating that the doctor did not have the cure for what Nanak was suffering from, which was an ailment that was spiritual in nature, not physical.

=== Marriage ===
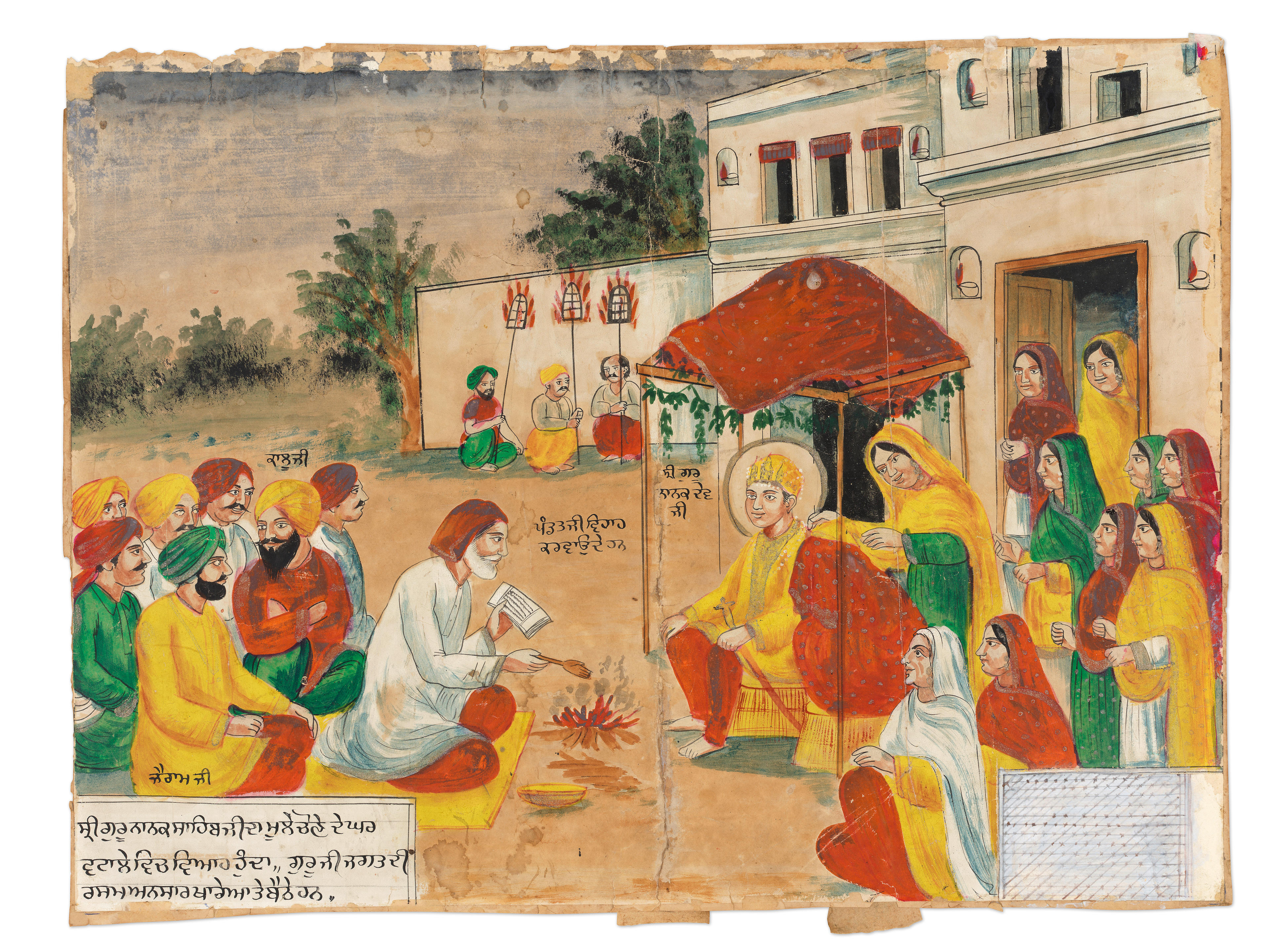
Wedding of Guru Nanak Dev and Mata Sulakhni, with family members and villagers, attributed to Gian Singh 'Naqqash', circa early-20th century

As a young man, (Note: Macauliffe (1909) notes that, according to the janamsakhi of Mani Singh, Nanak was married at the age of 14, not 18. "It is related in the Janamsakhi which bears the name of Mani Singh, that Nanak was married at the age of fourteen" (p. 18) Subsequent janamsakhis, however, claim that Nanak was married later, after he moved to Sultanpur (p. 29).) Nanak had an arranged marriage to Sulakhani, daughter of Mūl Chand (aka Mula) (Note: "He was betrothed to Sulakhani, daughter of Mula, a resident of Batala in the present district of Gurdaspur." (Macauliffe 1909, p.19). "As a young man Nanak was married to Sulakhni, a daughter of Mula, a native of the newly founded town of Batala who had come there from his village, Pakho dī Randhawi, on the left bank of the river Ravi. Mula belonged to the subcaste Chona which was less important than even the subcaste Bedi.". (Grewal 1998, p. 6)) and Chando Raṇi. They were married on 24 September 1487, in the town of Batala, and would go on to have two sons, Sri Chand (b. 1494) and Lakhmi Chand (or Lakhmi Das, b. 1496 or 1497). (Note: Trumpp (1877) transliterates the names of Nanak's children from the Colebrooke janamsakhi as "Sirī-čand" and "Lakhmī-dās", rather than "Lakhmī-čand" (pp. iii, viii). Macauliffe (1909, p. 29) also gives their names as Sri Chand and Lakhmi Das.) Nanak lived in Sultanpur until c. 1500, which would be a formative time for him, as the puratan janamsakhi suggests, and in his numerous allusions to governmental structure in his hymns, most likely gained at this time. Some sources claim that Nanak married later on at the age of nineteen.

=== Move to Sultanpur ===
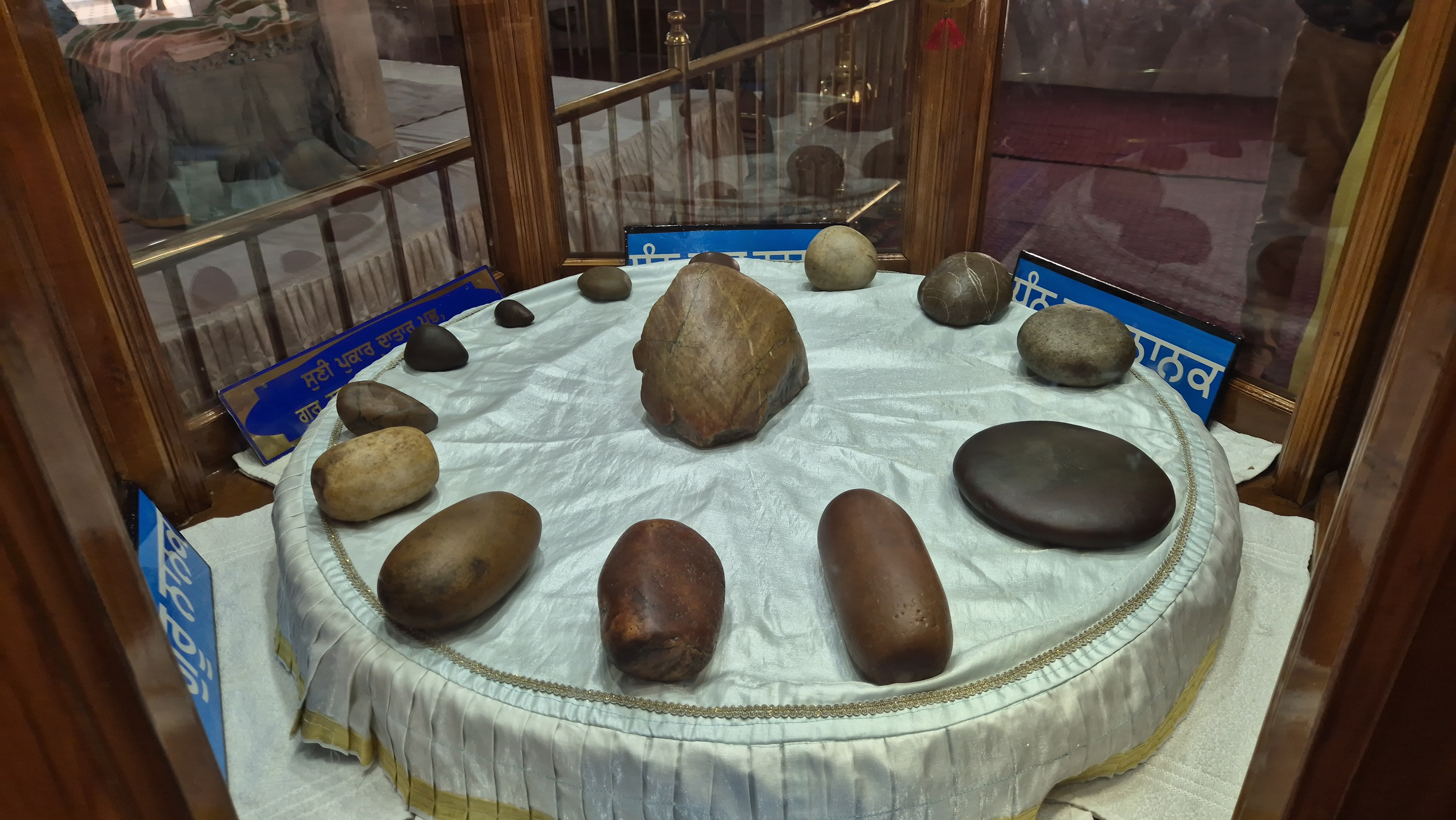
Measuring stones used by Guru Nanak during his work at Sultanpur Lodhi

Jai Ram, Nanaki's husband, was employed at a modikhana (a storehouse for revenues collected in non-cash form), in the service of the Delhi Sultanate's Lahore governor Daulat Khan (who was a Pathan), at which Ram would help Nanak get a job. Nanak moved to Sultanpur, and started working at the modikhana around the age of 16. Nanak began working as the custodian-general at the state's stores. According to Mandair, Nanak began working as an accountant in a local village near Sultanpur. After earning an income, his wife was able to join him, which was around when Nanak was 19 years old. After this, Nanak's life became more stable, with him devoting his efforts to his job during the day and spending his time on spiritual singing (kirtan) at night and early morning-hours, bathing in the Bein river at dawn, and then sleeping, waking-up, working, and repeat, with this cyclical lifestyle continuing for around twelve years. Two sons, Sri Chand and Lakhmi Das, were born to the couple during the Sultanpur chapter.

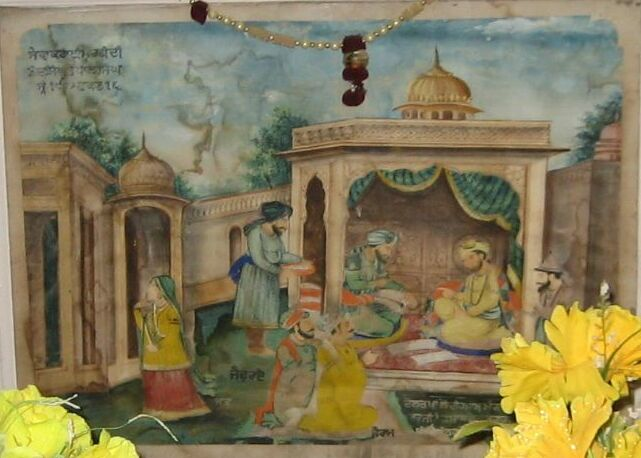
Painting of Guru Nanak detained at Sultanpur Lodhi whilst his accounts are being checked after a false complaint lodged by his detractors

Also at Sultanpur, Nanak became reacquainted with his childhood musician friend Mardana, who performed spiritual devotional singing with him. In one tale, Nanak criticizes a Qazi who was focused on thinking about his foal at home rather than concentrating on his prayers. Other miracles tied to this period involve claims against Nanak that he was giving away food for free from the granaries but when the stock was checked, nothing out of place was found. When weighing rations, when Nanak reached the number thirteen, pronounced tera in Punjabi, he would repeat the word tera, tera, tera... as it means "yours, yours, yours" in Punjabi as well, a religious expression. As part of his employment, Guru Nanak was exposed to village (Talwandi), district (Sultanpur), and provincial (Lahore) levels of administration.

=== Spiritual rebirth ===
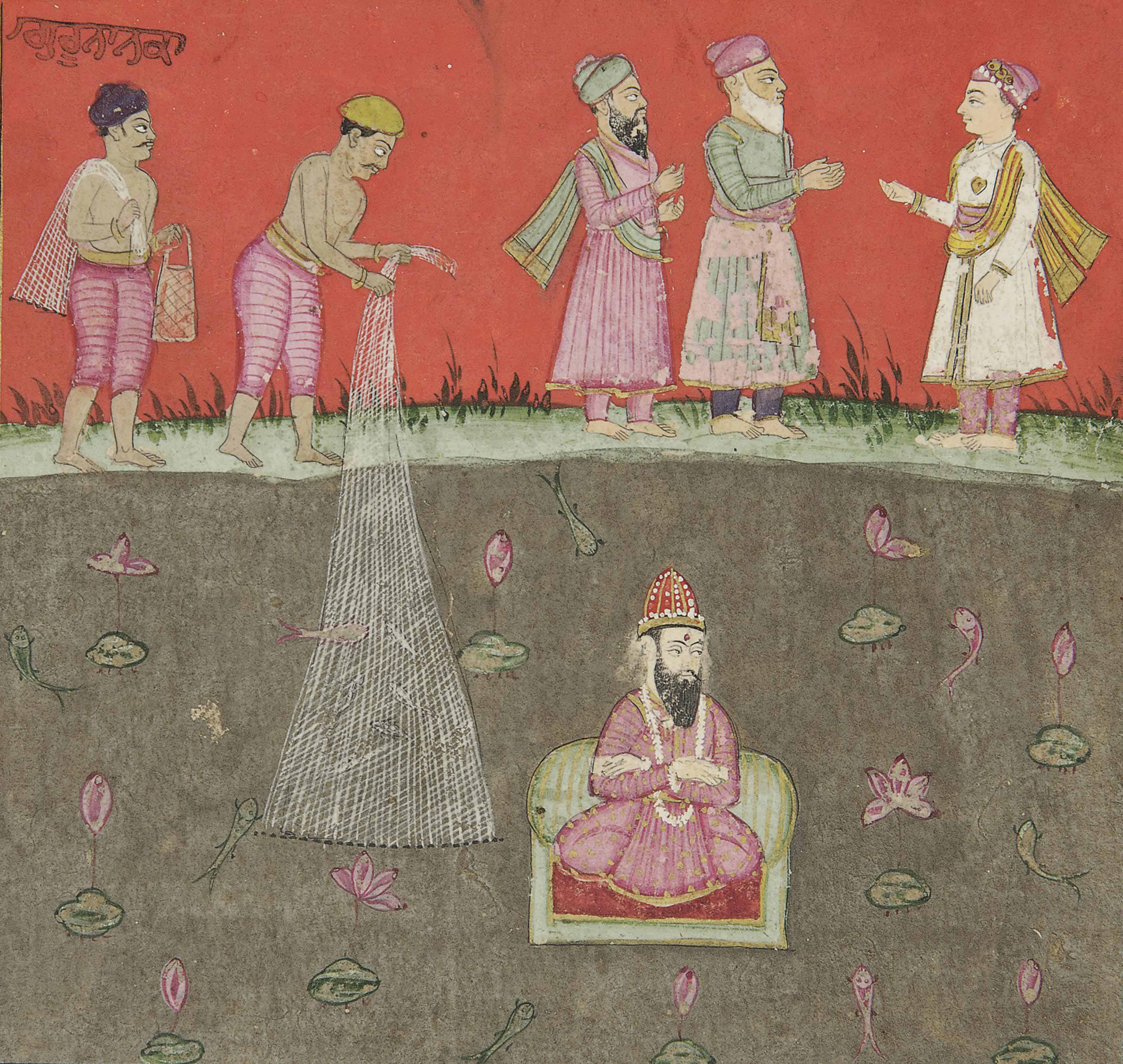
Janamsakhi series painting depicting the search-and-rescue mission launched to recover Guru Nanak from the Kali Bein

According to Sikh belief, a pivotal spiritual event in the form of a revelation happened to Nanak at the age of 33, which is said to have sparked his religious career. According to Kapur Singh, this event occurred in circa 1496 when Nanak was 27 years old, an earlier date and age. One day, Nanak is said to have disappeared into the Bein river while doing his normal morning bathing routine. Searches for Nanak by the locals failed to find him, with his clothes being found near the river it was assumed that Nanak had drowned. The Muslim employer of Nanak had fishermen cast nets in the river in an attempt to recover the assumed corpse of Nanak to no success. On the third or fourth day after his disappearance, Nanak returned but was silent and secluded himself from others, only responding to queries with the phrase: "There is no Hindu, there is no Muslim". The phrase highlights the equality of mankind despite religious differences. According to the Janamsakhi literature, during the time he was gone, Nanak underwent a rite-of-passage at the court of God, he was given amrit (ambrosial-nectar) and a robe-of-honour (sirpao or siropa) by God, elevating him to the status of guru-hood, with a divine voice tasking him to spread the teachings of naam simran (remembrance of the name), dan (charity), isnan (cleansing), and seva (selfless-service). Before returning to the world, Nanak was tested by being asked how one would praise the divine name, with Nanak replying by revealing a song of praise, which is now found in the Japji composition:

There is but one God, True is His Name,
The Creator, Fearless, without rancour,
Timeless, Unborn, Self-existent
By God's grace he is known
Meditate on Him
He was True
In the beginning, in the Primal time,
O Nanak, True He is and will be hereafter.

— Nanak, Japji Sahib

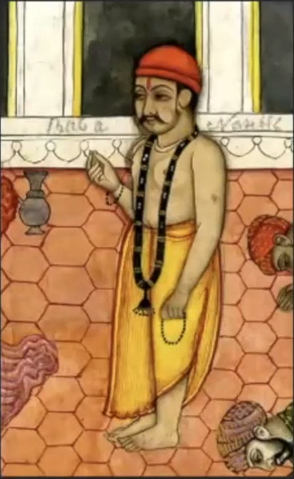
Detail of Guru Nanak from a Janamsakhi painting of Guru Nanak praying at the mosque with the Muslims. North India, circa late 18th century. Kept in the British Museum.

Nanak's expression "there is no Hindu, no Muslim" caused him to be summoned to the court of Sultanpur, as a Qazi protested to Daulat Khan Lodhi. When Nanak later met the Qazi and joined them in their prayers, he criticized the Qazi for not being focused during his prayers. Nanak began teaching about the Divine unity, embodied as Ik Onkar, transcending pre-existing religious identities and divisions of the era. The first person to accept Nanak had achieved a state of enlightenment was his elder sister, Nanaki.

=== Travels ===
After this point, Nanak left his government employment at Sultanpur and set aside an ordinary, familial lifestyle and embarked on a spiritual journey. His first followers drew from both Hindu and Muslim backgrounds. The Janamsakhis claim he went on lengthy tours across the Indian subcontinent and beyond, with these voyages being termed udasis (Gurmukhi: ਉਦਾਸੀਆਂ). The exact routes and places visited by Nanak during these extensive tours and the stories' authenticity is debated in academia. Nanak did not author an exact record or account of the places he visited but compositions authored by him reveal some of the conversations he held with others when touring. The locals of places he visited could not decipher if Nanak was a Hindu or Muslim, as he adopted clothing associated with both groups, namely fakirs and sadhus. When visiting a location, Nanak held discourses with local Hindu and Muslim figures of the area, visited mandirs, mosques, viharas, and khanaqahs, and attended fairs and festivals.

The travelling period of Guru Nanak spanned from age 33 to 50. According to Kapur Singh, he first travelled around northern and western Punjab for a while with Mardana, such as to Saidpur and Multan, spreading his teachings of naam japo (remembrance of God), kirat karo (honest work), and vand chhako (sharing), and denouncing the Varnasramadharma aspect of the Indian caste system, staying at the house of the low-caste Bhai Lalo. Bhai Lalo was appointed as the first Sikh missionary by Nanak.

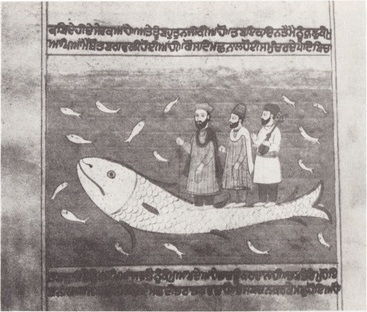
Janamsakhi manuscript painting with the caption 'Overseas travel with Bala and Mardana', Guru Nanak and his two companions are standing atop of a giant fish

After his travels in Punjab, Nanak conducted his famous and more geographically expansive four tours. He first went on an eastward tour, visiting Mathura, Varanasi, Bodh Gaya, Bengal, Assam, and returned by passing through Jagannath Puri. In Punjab, he visited Pak Pattan and other Sufi shrines. His second tour was southward, visiting Tamil Nadu and Sri Lanka, and stopping by Malabar, Mumbai, and Rajasthan on his return to Punjab. His third tour was to the north, visiting Ladakh and Tibet. The fourth and final tour was westward, visiting Mecca, Medina, and Baghdad. While coming back from his last tour, he was an eye-witness to the invasion of India by the armies of Babur at Saidpur, with the events being recorded in the Babur Vani work consisting of four hymns. On his eastern and western tours, he was accompanied by Mardana (who played the rabab instrument to accompany Nanak's singing of hymns during the tours), whilst for his northern and southern tours, he was accompanied by low-caste Hindus. The travelling period of Guru Nanak is associated with many supernatural and fantastical tales to impart a teaching, such as the story of Lalo and Malik Bhago at Eminabad, or Nanak sleeping with his feet toward the Kaaba at Mecca and it following the direction of his feet whenever a Qazi tried to move them away from the direction of the Kaaba. Another miraculous story involves Nanak stopping a large boulder with his hand. Other accounts are of snippets of wisdom, sometimes with elements of humour, such as him placing a jasmine petal of a flower on an overflowing cup of milk at Multan to signify the importance of spiritual quality over quantity, or Nanak at Haridwar criticizing the practice of throwing water from Ganges toward the sun by instead throwing it toward his agricultural fields, showing the futility of such an exercise. Nanak after a travel would return to Sultanpur before embarking on another. The Sikh written accounts are silent on the lives of Nanak's wife and two sons whilst he was away on his travels.

=== Kartarpur chapter ===
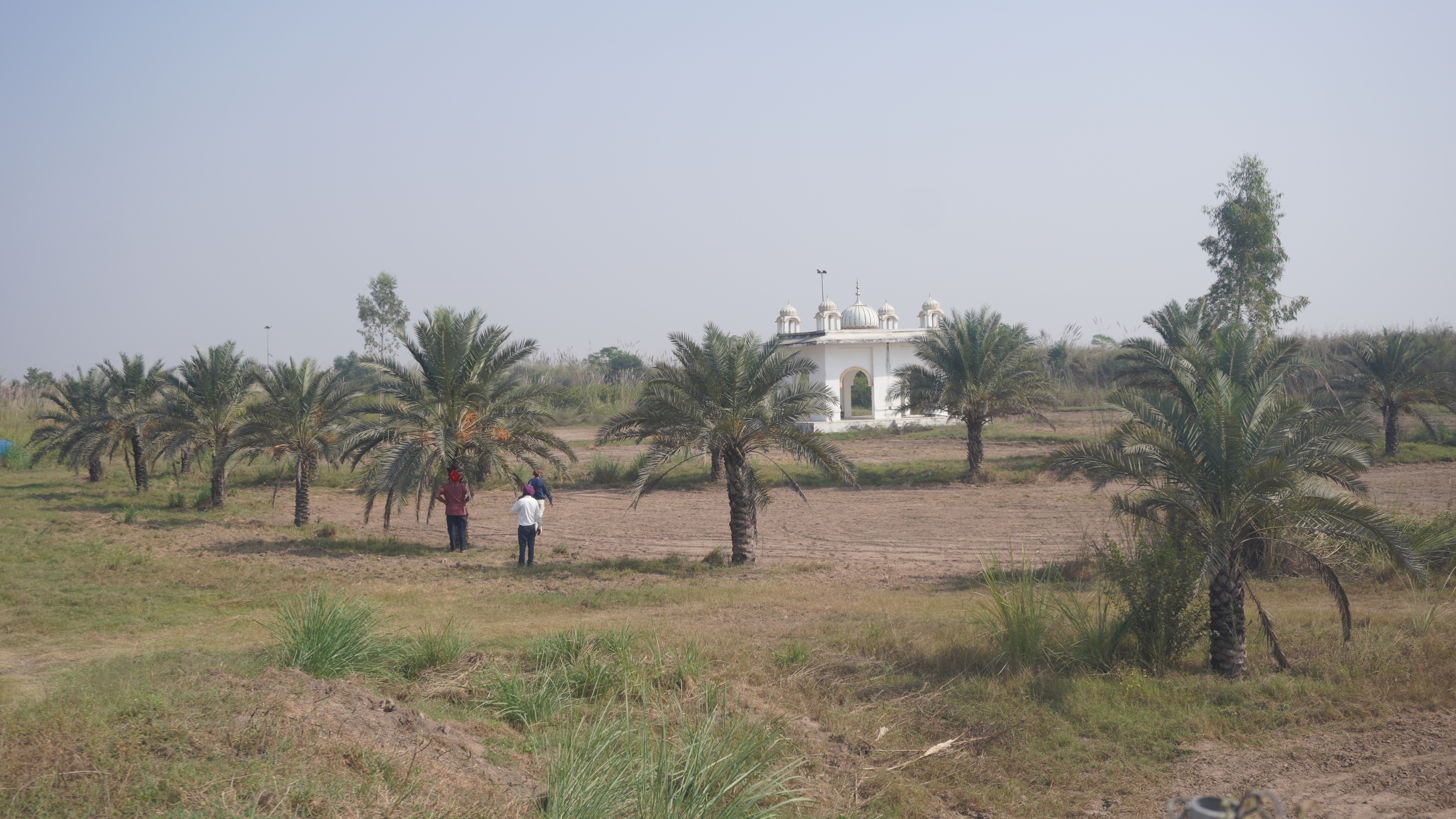
Agricultural fields where Guru Nanak used to perform cultivation, located near Gurdwara Darbar Sahib Kartarpur, Pakistan

By the age of 50, Nanak had amassed a considerable group of followers, known as the Nanak Panth, with them likely being mostly his relatives, friends, and initially other Khatris, later large amounts of Jatts joined Nanak's movement (with the Jatts being noted for anti-Brahminical views). When returning from one of his travels, Nanak located a spot by the Ravi (on the river's right bank) that he found suitable for establishing an ashram, with the land being donated for this purpose by one of Nanak's followers, with this settlement becoming Kartarpur. The region was surrounded by ample natural resources and fertile land.

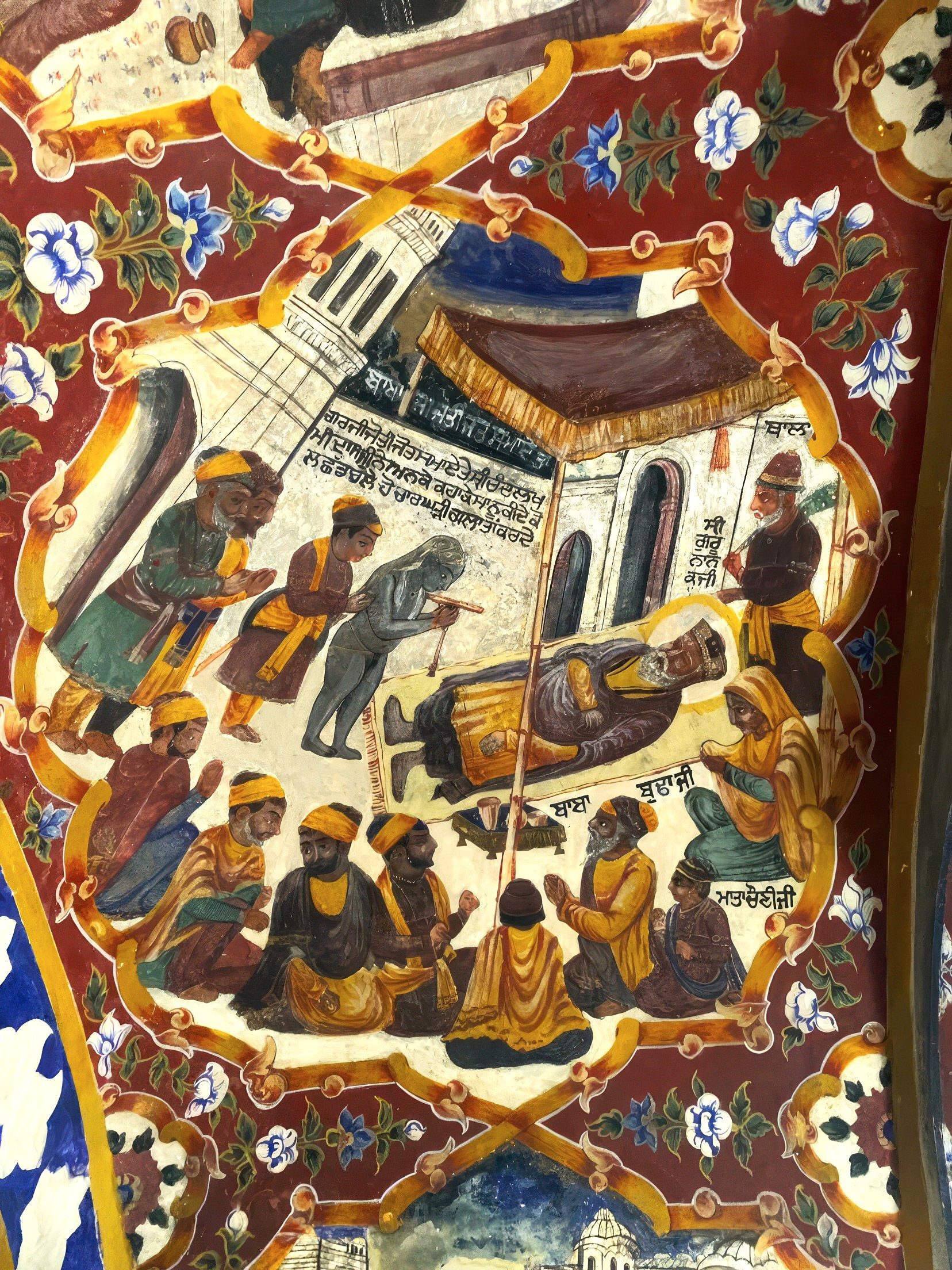
Fresco depicting the body of Guru Nanak after his death as his family and followers stand around him, from Gurdwara Baba Atal, Amritsar, circa 19th century.

Around the age of 55, Nanak settled in Kartarpur (meaning "Creator's town"), living there until his death in September 1539. Nanak adopted the lifestyle of a house-holder while he resided at Kartarpur and his chapter of his life is covered by various sakhis and by Bhai Gurdas' later Varan. Becoming a bābā, Nanak taught a life of honest-work, devotion, and provided personal religious instruction at Kartarpur, hoping to realize a society free of economic and social discrimination. The families that came to live in Kartarpur adopted a lifestyle of truthful living, known as sac acār, based upon Sikh religious tenets and principles, such as divine immanence (nām), social commitment (dān), and internal purity (iśnān), with practices such as communal eating (langar), self-less service (sevā), and sharing (kirat). Nanak taught a life of being engaged with the world, rejecting any form of asceticism. The followers, known as a sangat, practiced waking up at dawn, bathing, and singing together in communal kirtan sessions or chanting the name of God, with them continuing their normal lives after completion, with them coming together for kirtan by the afternoon. This way of life began to spread to other localities that had followers of Nanak, with local leaders forming in each congregation. The Japji composition, which Nanak had been working on for decades by this point, was finalized during this time and introduced as part of regular Sikh religious regimen to be recited, alongside the Kirtan Sohila and Rahiras compositions. The institutions of langar (adopted from earlier Sufi and Nath practices) and pangat were introduced to the congregations to practice and introduce a lived and practical example of gender, caste, and religious-equality, which was maintained through communal donations. The charan pahul ("nectar of the feet") initiation ceremony was introduced, whereby a group of new initiates to the religious movement would drink the water that Nanak's toe had been dipped in from the same cup of water, irrespective of individual caste-backgrounds.

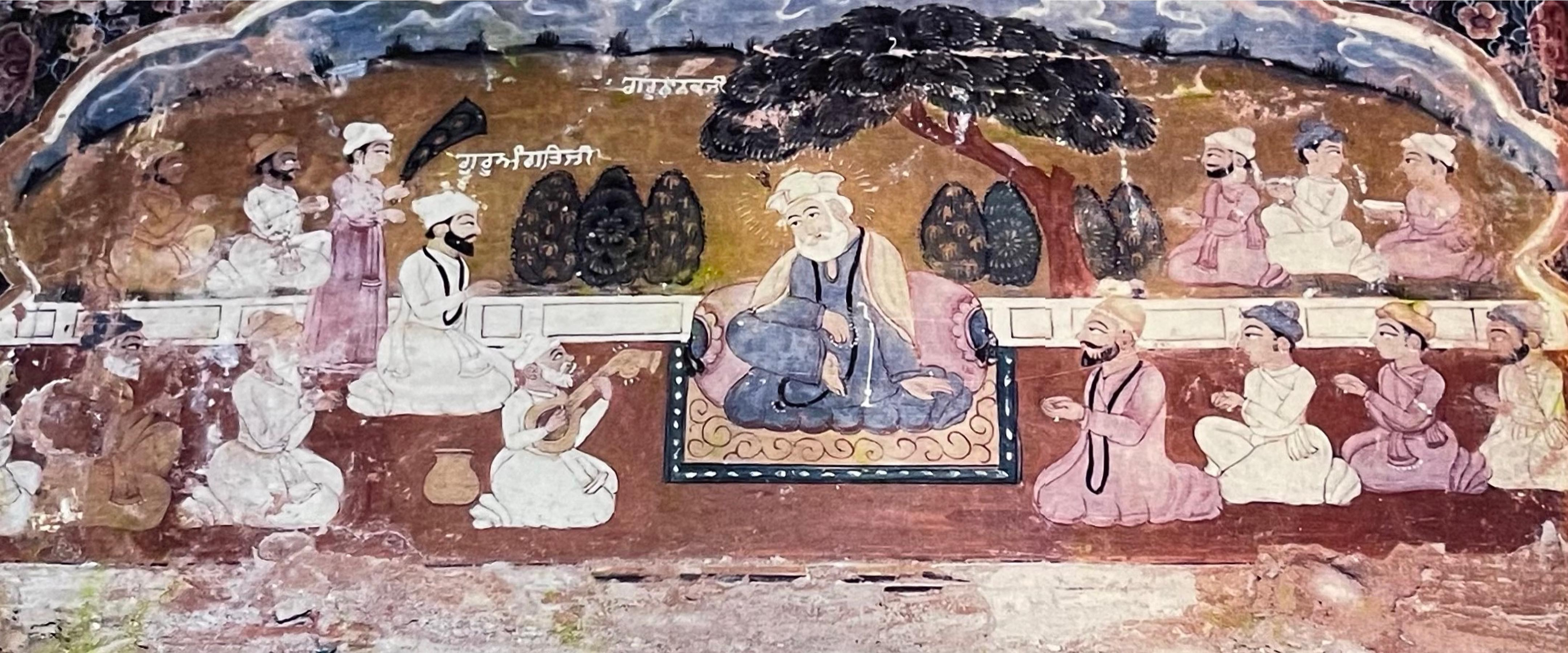
Fresco depicting Guru Nanak and Guru Angad together with a flock of devotees and attendants surrounding them, Gurdwara Ramsar Sahib, circa 19th century

During this period, he went on short journeys to the Nath yogi centre of Achal, and the Sufi centres of Pakpattan and Multan. By the time of his death, Nanak had acquired several followers in the Punjab region, although it is hard to estimate their number based on the extant historical evidence. The followers of Nanak were called Kartārīs (meaning 'the people who belonged to the village of Kartarpur') by others. The Global Institute of Sikh Studies places the start of the Sikh religion to c. 1520 with Guru Nanak establishment of Kartarpur.

=== Death and succession ===
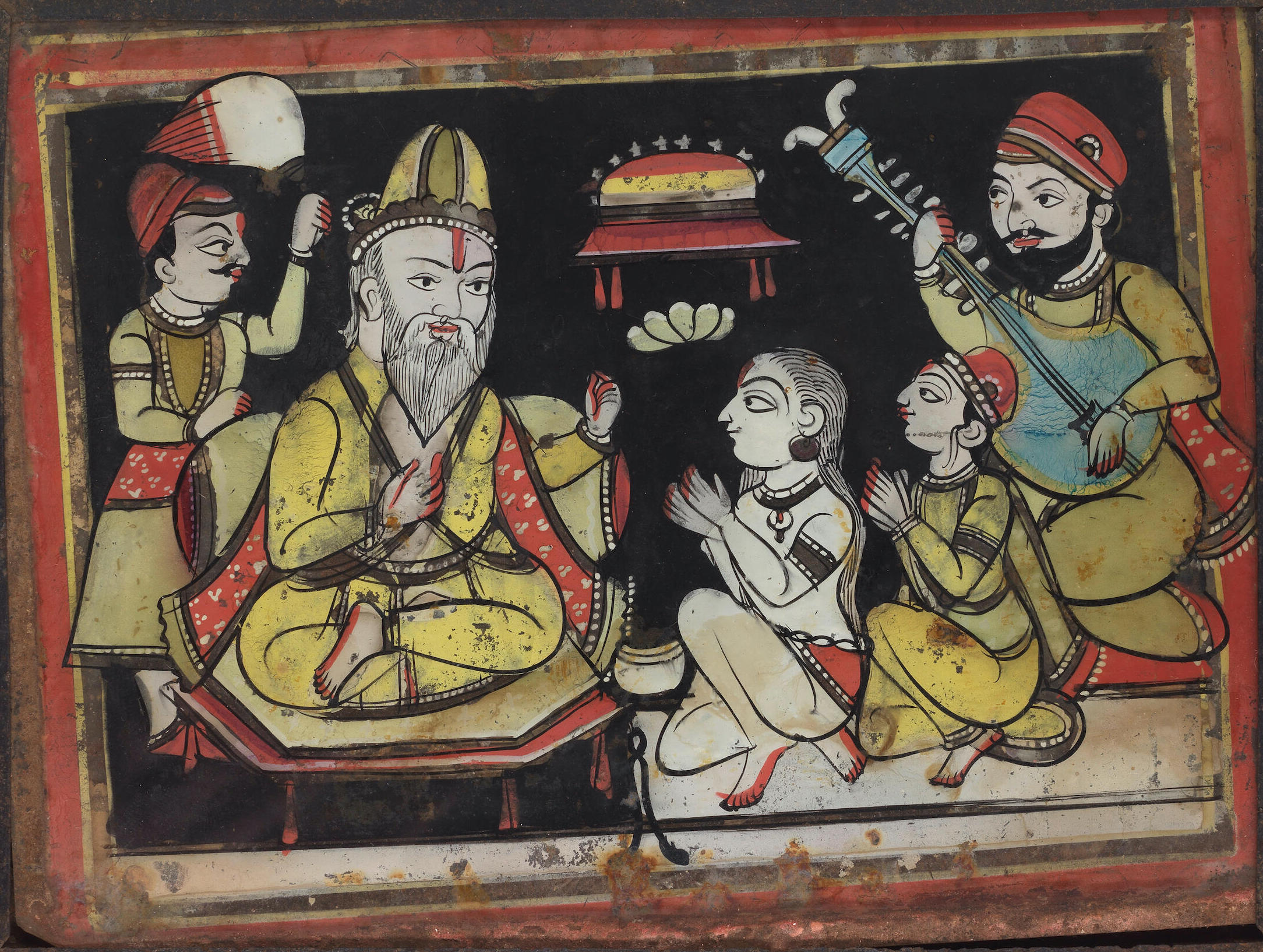
Reverse glass painting of Guru Nanak, with Bhai Mardana and Bhai Bala, and Nanak's two sons, Sri Chand and Lakhmi Das, circa early-20th century

Nanak decided to not pass on the mantle of guruship to his sons, as Sri Chand was an ascetic, a lifestyle that Nanak had reprimanded, and Lakhmi Das was not interested in religion and had his own family. Nanak had examined the worthiness of his sons by a series of tests, that, according to Bhai Gurdas, they both failed at. Despite being passed over for the Sikh guruship, Sri Chand had a successful religious career and founded a sect known as the Udasis.

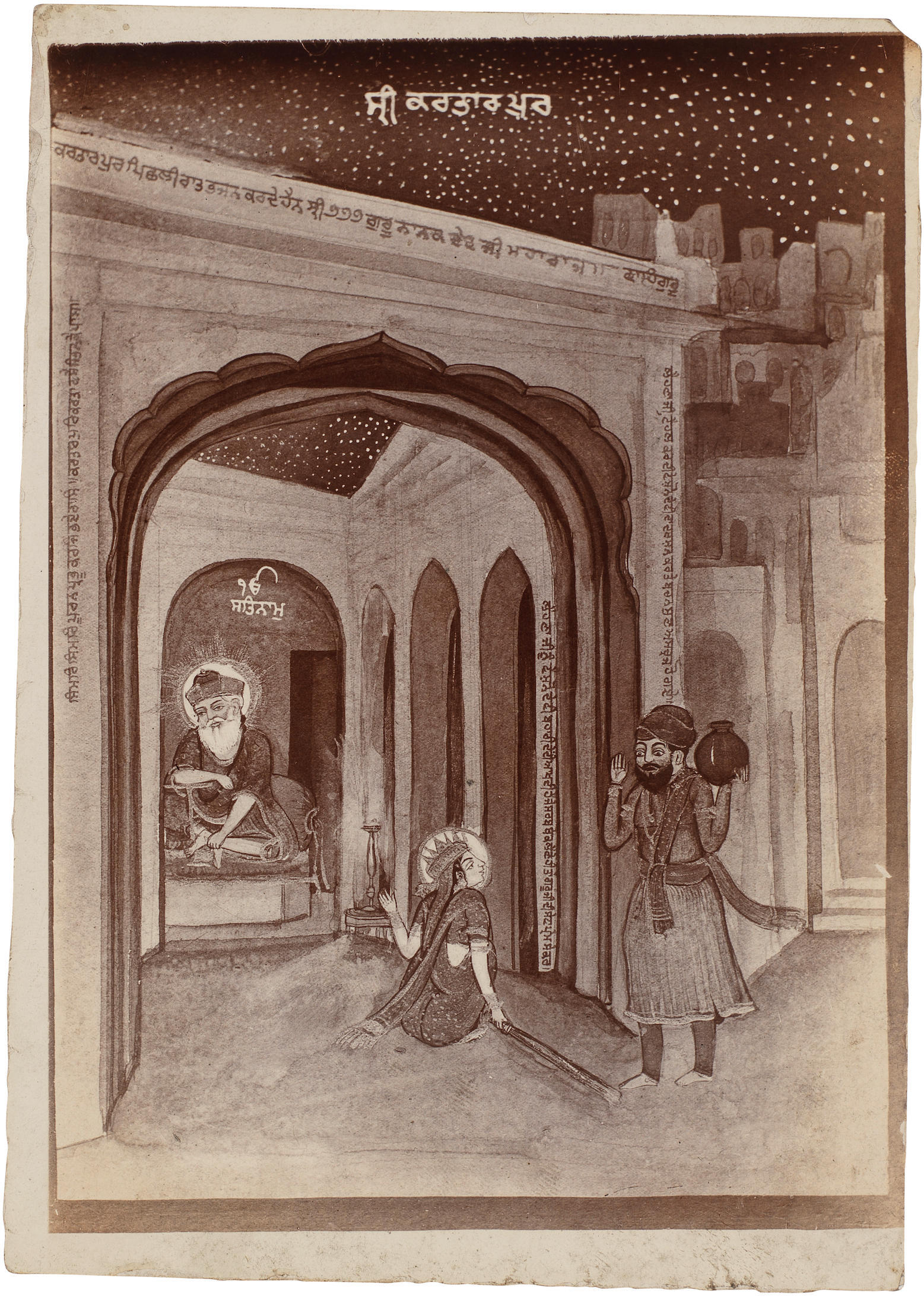
Photograph of a painting of Guru Nanak meditating at Kartarpur with an Indic deity and Bhai Lehna (later Guru Angad) observing, Arthur Probsthain Bookshop, circa early 20th century

Instead, Nanak appointed Bhai Lehna of Khadur as the successor Guru, renaming him as Guru Angad, meaning "one's very own" or "part of you". Thus, Nanak did not merely name Angad as his successor but also established him as an equal. Lehna was originally a worshipper of Durga and had probably met Nanak in his late 20s, joining his ashram after being impressed by Nanak. In turn, Nanak was satisfied by the love, humility, loyalty, service, and householder-lifestyle that Lehna showcased, which influenced him to select him as his successor when the time came. The ceremony to mark Angad as his successor consisted of Nanak placing a coconut and five paisse before Lehna, with Nanak bowing toward Lehna, finalizing the successor-selection and elevation of Lehna to the gurgadhi (seat of the guru). Writings in the Guru Granth Sahib also allude to a tikka being placed on Angad's forehead and a canopy being placed on-top of Angad's head. Sikhs theologically view the passing of successorship from Nanak to Angad as one light passing between two bodies. According to Mandair, whilst choosing a successor who was not biologically related to oneself was nothing new in Indian society and had been done before, the fact that Nanak chose a successor at all means he meant for his spiritual work to be continued and that it was possible for any of his followers to reach a state of perfection (elevation to guru-status or becoming a gurmukh) within the span of a single human lifetime, with a guru and a Sikh being interchangeable and not divinely ordained, and that the founder and successor are to be viewed as one, with there being no difference. Mandair states that the selection of an immediate successor by the founder of the movement itself allowed the early Sikh community to survive as a distinct group and not be replaced by or absorbed into other sects.

The bards Balvand and Satta state the following in the Guru Granth Sahib regarding to succession of Guru Angad:

Nanak established his empire, Building his true fort on firm foundations; He placed the canopy on Lahina's head, As he praised the Divine, sipped ambrosia; He handed the strong sword made from, The instruction of spiritual wisdom. The Guru bowed to his disciple, During his own lifetime; He put the tikka, While still alive. Now Lahina succeeded Nanak - He deserved it so, It was the same light, it was the same manner, It was the body that was changed; The immaculate canopy waves over him, He has occupied the throne in the Guru's trade.

— Satta and Balvand, Guru Granth Sahib, 966–967

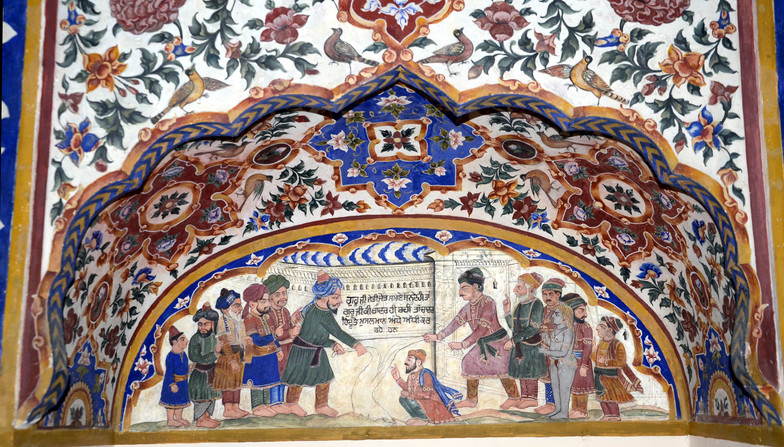
Hindus and Muslims disputing over the final rites of Guru Nanak. 19th century fresco from Gurdwara Baba Atal, Amritsar.

Shortly after proclaiming his successor, Nanak died on 22 September 1539 in Kartarpur, at the age of 70. According to Sikh hagiography, particularly the Puratan Janamsakhi tradition, the question of what to do with Nanak's remains led to a dispute between his Muslim and Hindu followers. According to the legend, when the quarrelling Hindus and Muslims tugged at the sheet that had been covering Nanak's body, they found instead a heap of flowers in its place, with Nanak's body disappeared. The Muslims and Hindus each gathered the flowers found and either cremated or buried them as per their customs.

After Nanak's passing, the early Sikh community's headquarters was shifted from Kartarpur to the village of Khadur by his successor, Guru Angad, as Guru Nanak's sons claimed their father's property at Kartarpur.

== Odysseys (Udasis) ==
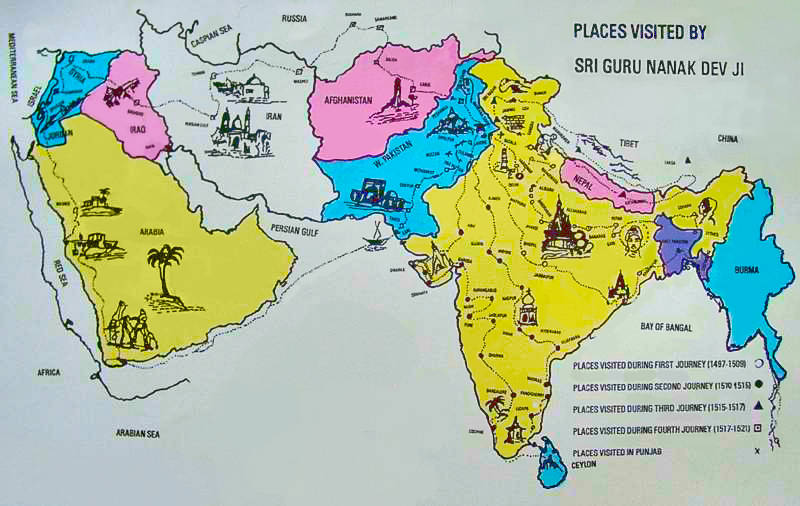
The four Udasis and other locations visited by Guru Nanak

During the first quarter of the 16th century, Nanak went on long udasiya ('journeys') for spiritual pursuits. A verse authored by him states that he visited several places in "nau-khand" ('the nine regions of the earth'), presumably the major Hindu and Muslim pilgrimage centres.

Some modern accounts state that he visited Tibet, most of South Asia, and Arabia, starting in 1496 at age 27, when he left his family for a thirty-year period. These claims include Nanak's visit to Mount Sumeru of Indian mythology, as well as Mecca, Baghdad, Achal Batala, and Multan, where he would debate religious ideas with opposing groups. These stories became widely popular in the 19th and 20th century, and exist in many versions.

In 1508, Nanak visited the Sylhet region in Bengal. The janamsakhis suggest that Nanak visited the Ram Janmabhoomi temple in Ayodhya in 1510–11 CE.

The Baghdad inscription remains the basis of writing by Indian scholars that Guru Nanak journeyed in the Middle East, with some claiming he visited Jerusalem, Mecca, Vatican, Azerbaijan, and Sudan.

=== Disputes ===
The hagiographic details are a subject of dispute, with modern scholarship questioning the details and authenticity of many claims. For example, Callewaert and Snell (1994) state that early Sikh texts do not contain such stories. From when the travel stories first appear in hagiographic accounts of Guru Nanak, centuries after his death, they continue to become more sophisticated as time goes on, with the late phase Puratan version describing four missionary journeys, which differ from the Miharban version.

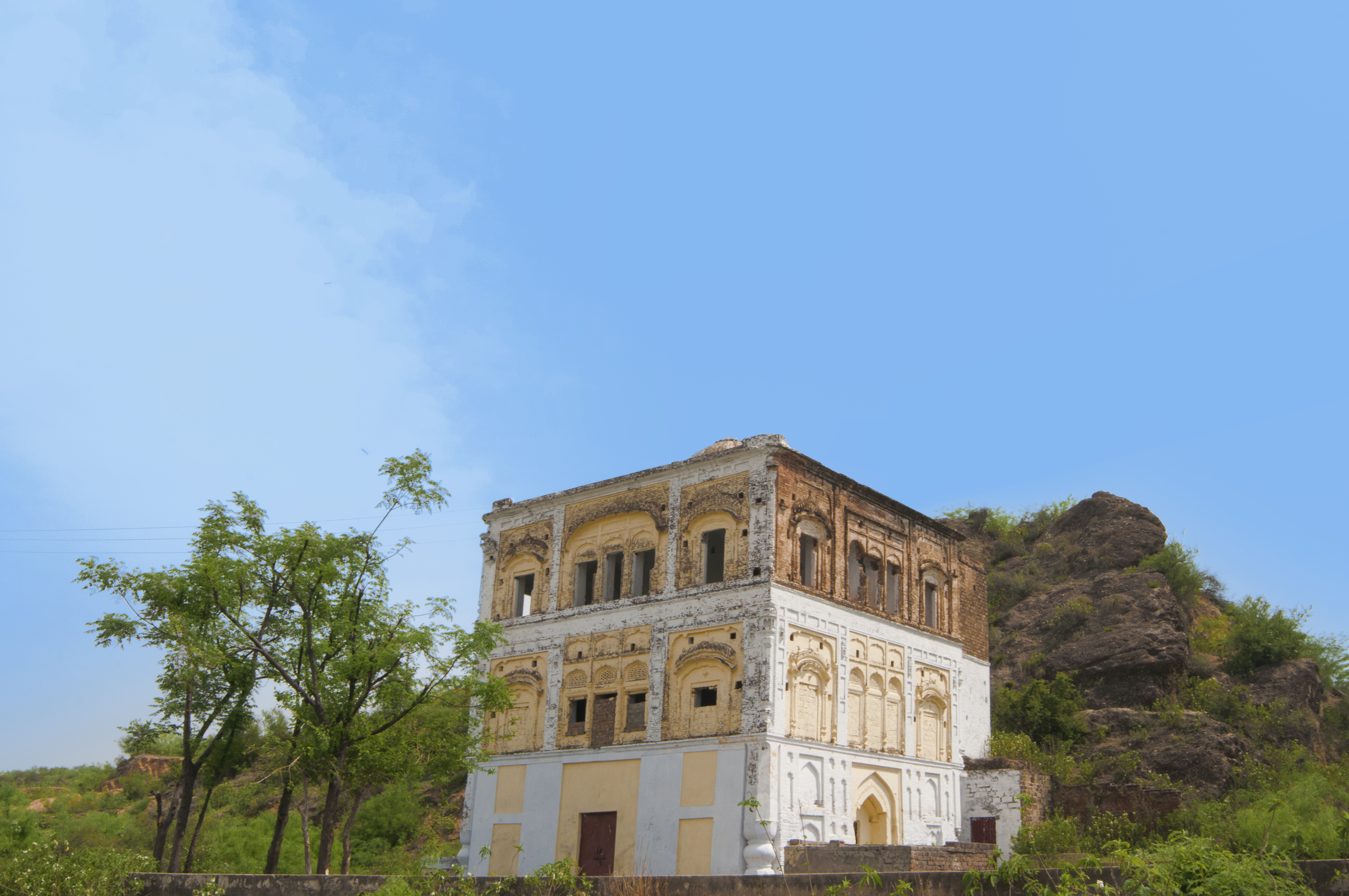
The abandoned Gurudwara Chowa Sahib, located near the Rohtas Fort in Pakistan, commemorates the site where Guru Nanak is popularly believed to have created a water-spring during one of his udasis.

Some of the stories about Guru Nanak's extensive travels first appear in the 19th-century Puratan janamsakhi, though even this version does not mention Nanak's travel to Baghdad. Such embellishments and insertion of new stories, according to Callewaert and Snell (1993), closely parallel claims of miracles by Islamic pirs found in Sufi tadhkirahs of the same era, giving reason to believe that these legends may have been written in a competition.

Another source of dispute has been the Baghdad stone, bearing an inscription in a Turkish script. Some interpret the inscription as saying Baba Nanak Fakir was there in 1511–1512; others read it as saying 1521–1522 (and that he lived in the Middle East for 11 years away from his family). Others, particularly Western scholars, argue that the stone inscription is from the 19th century and the stone is not a reliable evidence that Nanak visited Baghdad in the early 16th century. Moreover, beyond the stone, no evidence or mention of his journey in the Middle East has been found in any other Middle Eastern textual or epigraphical records. Claims have been asserted of additional inscriptions, but no one has been able to locate and verify them.

Novel claims about his travels, as well as claims such as his body vanishing after his death, are also found in later versions and these are similar to the miracle stories in Sufi literature about their pirs. Other direct and indirect borrowings in the Sikh janamsakhis relating to legends around his journeys are from Hindu epics and puranas, and Buddhist Jataka stories.

== Historical accounts ==
There is a lack of factual documentation on Guru Nanak's life, with little that can be ascertained. Thus, there has been a distinction made between the "historical Nanak" and the "legendary Nanak". Much of what is known on the life of Nanak comes from hagiographical accounts known as Janamsakhis, which can be further divided into the Bala, Miharban, Adi, and Puratan traditions, which all contain much anecdotal information as they were originally written as religious in nature with no intention of them being factual or objective accounts of Nanak's life. Thus, the Janamsakhis contain a mixture of mythology, history, philosophy, and geography, a long-standing theme in native Indian religious writing, such as the Itihasa works. Furthermore, the Janamsakhis were influenced by the Islamicate tradition prevalent in Punjab at the time of miraculous stories involving Muhammad and Muslim saints (mu'jizat and karamat). Kapur Singh claims the Bala janamsakhi was influenced by the Buddhist jataka tales, which is why it contains fantastical elements. Other sources used to reconstruct Nanak's life are the ballads of Bhai Gurdas and compositions found in the Sikh scriptures. The stories (sakhis) covering Guru Nanak usually involve him imparting a lesson of equality by logically dismantling a prevailing belief or custom he deems contrary to it. Bhai Gurdas attempted to give an authoritative albeit brief account on the life of Nanak in his Vaars. In 1976, Fauja Singh and Kirpal Singh authored the book Atlas: Travels of Guru Nanak to document the travels of Guru Nanak.

=== Posthumous biographies ===
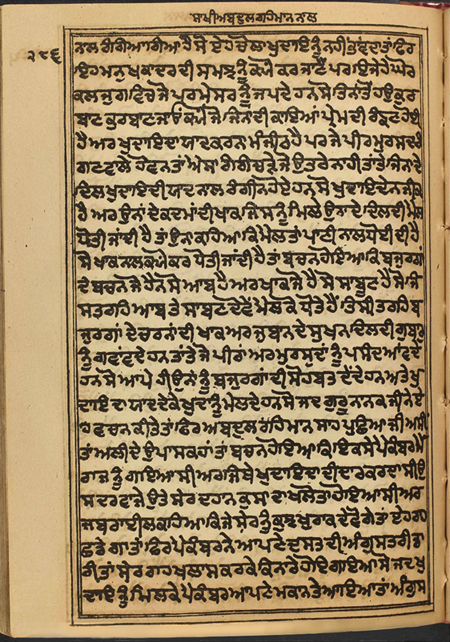
Bhai Mani Singh's Janamsakhi

The earliest biographical sources on Nanak's life recognised today are the janamsakhis ('birth stories'), which recount the circumstances of his birth in extended detail.

Gyan-ratanavali is the janamsakhi attributed to Bhai Mani Singh, a disciple of Guru Gobind Singh who was approached by some Sikhs with a request that he should prepare an authentic account of Nanak's life. As such, it is said that Bhai Mani Singh wrote his story with the express intention of correcting heretical accounts of Nanak.

One popular janamsakhi was allegedly written by Bhai Bala, a close companion of Nanak. However, the writing style and language employed have left scholars, such as Max Arthur Macauliffe, certain that they were composed after his death. According to such scholars, there are good reasons to doubt the claim that the author was a close companion of Guru Nanak and accompanied him on many of his travels.

Bhai Gurdas, a scribe of the Guru Granth Sahib, also wrote about Nanak's life in his vars ('odes'), which were compiled some time after Nanak's life, though are less detailed than the janamsakhis.

Guru Nanak Dev, the founder of Sikhism, spent more than a year meditating on a site now known as Nanak Math, located in Balaju, Kathmandu. It is believed that Guru Nanak visited the math in 1516. Guru Nanak is traditionally locally known as Nanak Rishi in Nepal.

== Teachings ==
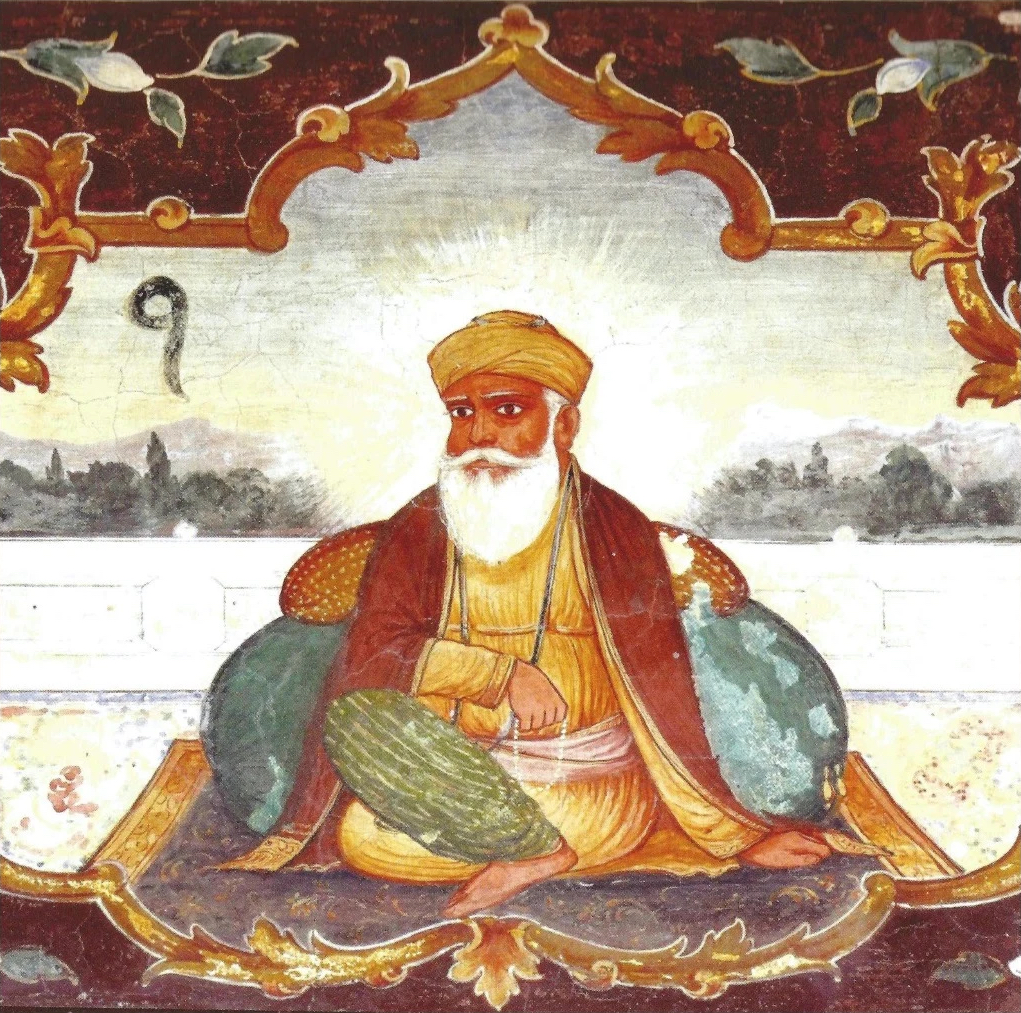
Fresco of Guru Nanak from Baoli Sahib, Goindwal

Nanak's teachings can be found in the Sikh scripture Guru Granth Sahib, as a collection of verses recorded in Gurmukhi.

There are three competing theories on Nanak's teachings. The first, according to Cole and Sambhi (1995, 1997), based on the hagiographical Janamsakhis, states that Nanak's teachings and Sikhism were revelations from God, and not a social protest movement nor an attempt to reconcile Hinduism and Islam in the 15th century.

The second theory states that Nanak was a Guru, not a prophet. According to Singha (2009):

Sikhism does not subscribe to the theory of incarnation or the concept of prophet hood. But it has a pivotal concept of Guru. He is not an incarnation of God, not even a prophet. He is an illumined soul.

The third theory is that Guru Nanak is the incarnation of God. This has been supported by many Sikhs including Bhai Gurdas, Bhai Vir Singh, Santhok Singh and is supported by the Guru Granth Sahib. Bhai Gurdas says:

ਗੁਰ ਪਰਮੇਸਰੁ ਇਕੁ ਹੈ ਸਚਾ ਸਾਹੁ ਜਗਤੁ ਵਣਜਾਰਾ।

The Guru and God are one; He is the true master and the whole world craves for Him.

Additionally, in the Guru Granth Sahib, it is stated:

ਨਾਨਕ ਸੇਵਾ ਕਰਹੁ ਹਰਿ ਗੁਰ ਸਫਲ ਦਰਸਨ ਕੀ ਫਿਰਿ ਲੇਖਾ ਮੰਗੈ ਨ ਕੋਈ ॥੨॥

O Nanak, serve the Guru, the Lord Incarnate; the Blessed Vision of His Darshan is profitable, and in the end, you shall not be called to account. ||2||

Guru Ram Das says:

ਗੁਰ ਗੋਵਿੰਦੁ ਗੋੁਵਿੰਦੁ ਗੁਰੂ ਹੈ ਨਾਨਕ ਭੇਦੁ ਨ ਭਾਈ ॥੪॥੧॥੮॥

The Guru is God, and God is the Guru, O Nanak; there is no difference between the two, O Siblings of Destiny. ||4||1||8||

The hagiographical Janamsakhis were not written by Nanak, but by later followers without regard for historical accuracy, containing numerous legends and myths created to show respect for Nanak. In Sikhism, the term revelation, as Cole and Sambhi clarify, is not limited to the teachings of Nanak. Rather, they include all Sikh Gurus, as well as the words of men and women from Nanak's past, present, and future, who possess divine knowledge intuitively through meditation. The Sikh revelations include the words of non-Sikh bhagats (Hindu & Muslim devotees), some who lived and died before the birth of Nanak, and whose teachings are part of the Sikh scriptures.

The Adi Granth and successive Sikh Gurus repeatedly emphasised, suggests Mandair (2013), that Sikhism is "not about hearing voices from God, but it is about changing the nature of the human mind, and anyone can achieve direct experience and spiritual perfection at any time." Nanak emphasised that all human beings can have direct access to God without rituals or priests.

The concept of man as elaborated by Nanak, states Mandair (2009), refines and negates the "monotheistic concept of self/God," where "monotheism becomes almost redundant in the movement and crossings of love." The goal of man, taught the Sikh Gurus, is to end all dualities of "self and other, I and not-I," attaining the "attendant balance of separation-fusion, self-other, action-inaction, attachment-detachment, in the course of daily life."

Nanak, and other Sikh Gurus emphasised bhakti ('love', 'devotion', or 'worship'), and taught that the spiritual life and secular householder life are intertwined. In the Sikh perspective, the everyday world is part of an infinite reality, where increased spiritual awareness leads to increased and vibrant participation in the everyday world. Nanak described living an "active, creative, and practical life" of "truthfulness, fidelity, self-control and purity" as being higher than the metaphysical truth.

Through popular tradition, Nanak's teaching is understood to be practised in three ways:

- Vand Shhako (ਵੰਡ ਛਕੋ, 'share & consume'): Share with others, help those who are in need, so you may eat together;
- Kirat Karo ('work honestly'): Earn an honest living, without exploitation or fraud; and
- Naam Japo (ਨਾਮ ਜਪੋ, 'recite His name'): Meditate on God's name, so to feel His presence and control the five thieves of the human personality.

Guru Nanak taught about the equality of mankind, despite gender, caste, and religious differences. During his era, the Hindus were divided into Vaishnavas, Shaivas, Nathas, and other groupings, whilst the Muslims had Sunnis, Shias, and Sufis, there were also Jains and Buddhists; Nanak saw all these identity-markers as irrelevant to God, as Nanak saw God as a unifying force rather than a divisive one. The caste divisions of varna, classifying humans into either Brahmins, Kshatriyas, Vaishyas, or Shudras, was also rejected by Nanak. Nanak also taught that women were not impure or inferior to men. Spiritual liberation, or mukti, is achieved by personal conduct and name-recitation, not social background. He also criticized the prevailing political regimes of the time for their greed and cruelty. He also stressed upon the importance of forgiveness. Furthermore, he did not believe family was alien to religion; instead he incorporated both social and religious spheres of life so that his followers could live a spiritual life whilst taking care of their worldly duties.

Guru Nanak also gave instructions for Muslims on how to be a proper Muslim as per him, which is as follows:

It is not easy to be called a Musalman:
If one be truly so, let him be so known.
First, he should take to heart his faith
And rid himself of all pride
Become a true disciple of the Prophet
And overcome the illusion of life and death;
He should accept the will of God Supreme,
Believe in the Creator, efface his ego
When he is merciful to all living beings, O Nanak,
Then will he be called a Musalman.

— Nanak, Var Majh, Guru Granth Sahib

== Literature ==
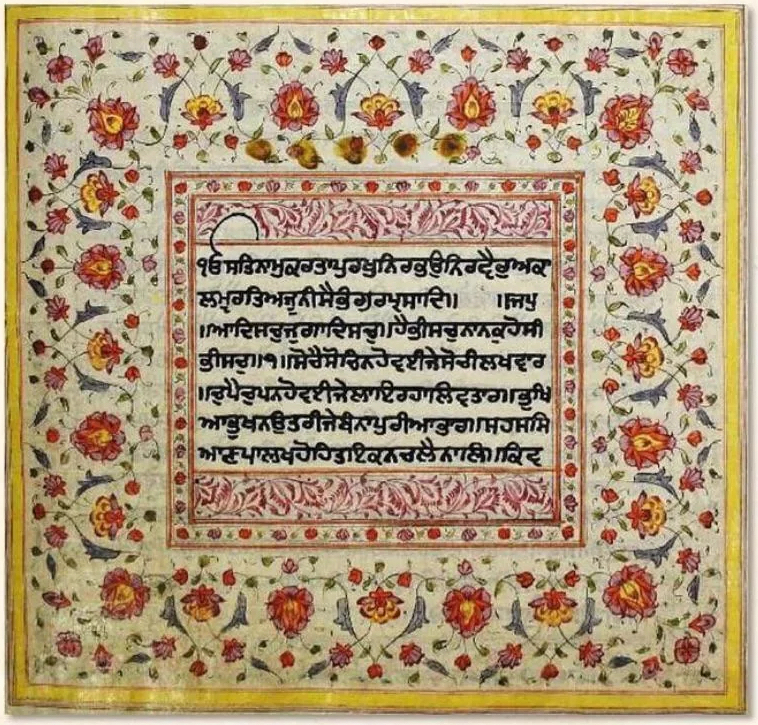
Illuminated and illustrated Guru Granth Sahib folio showing the Japji Sahib chapter, decorated with floral motifs

Guru Nanak's native vernacular was Shekhupuri. Guru Nanak was one of the first major authors of the Punjabi language but more precisely wrote in a composite vernacular known as Sant Bhasha. Guru Nanak likely adopted the vernacular so his works could be more accessible to a larger audience located in the Hindi zone, with Nanak's version of it bearing influences from Punjabi (specifically the central zone with both western and eastern Punjabi influences) and older Apabhraṁśa. Nanak was a poet and called himself as such (sairu or shair). One of the earliest verses authored by Nanak was when he was a child at the school of the village-teacher Gopal, where he authored a poem with the start of all its component stanzas based on each of the thirty-five letters of the native script on his patti, a traditional learning tablet, with this composition later being known as the Patti Likhi ("written on the tablet"), being set later on to Raag Asa in the Guru Granth Sahib. Guru Nanak authored much of the verses found in the Guru Granth Sahib, known as bani. The verses he authored are similar in message to the poetry of other prominent Nirgun Bhakti proponents of the era, such as Ravidas and Kabir. Nanak wrote in simple poetical metre, utilizing short, half-verses of three or four words with complex grammatical forms, providing a concise message in verse, utilizing forms such as the pithy couplets salok and doha but also lyrical hymns, such as the shabad and pad. Guru Nanak favoured the salok in his writings, consisting of an internal divide of two half-verses which end with a rhyme. The guru wrote long sequences of rhyming stanzas consisting of basic units, to provide a spiritual message that is clearly articulated. The languages utilized in his compositions consists of archaic Punjabi and Khariboli, with many Persian loanwords. Rather than only writing in the elite languages, such as Arabic, Persian, or Sanskrit, Nanak makes use of the vernacular Punjabi in his works to reach a wider audience. However, Nanak chose to include more Saraiki vocabulary in some works whilst consciously chose to use more Hindi or Sanskritic words when delving into Hindu religious topics. Nanak also authored three vārs included in the Guru Granth Sahib, with the most prominent being the Asa di Vār. The most celebrated composition by Guru Nanak is the Japji Sahib, which is a long work that does not only utilize a single metre, which makes it differ from most of the poetry in the Guru Granth Sahib. Nanak wrote using similes, analogies, and metaphors to explain philosophical concepts. He positions himself as being a slave of the divine in his works. Much of his works, such as in the Japji, are inquisitive in-nature, pondering upon the nature and purpose of the Universe or life itself yet not accepting any prevailing theories or claiming to know the answer, leaving the audience in a state of deep reflection and wonder. He spreads the message of love rather than hatred in his hymns and that it was more important to be a good human-being than being a "good Muslim" or "good Hindu". Guru Arjan collected and included 974 hymns authored by Nanak in his Ādi Granth compilation in 1604, with the Japji forming the opening of the work, with all subsequent works by the Sikh gurus being modelled after Guru Nanak's. It was during the Kartarpur chapter that Guru Nanak's compositions, viewed as a source of wisdom (sikhiā), were compiled in the form of a pothī (book), which was later handed over to Guru Angad on the occasion of his accession to guruship. The successors of Nanak would expand upon this collection, adding their own works and that of others.

== Influences ==
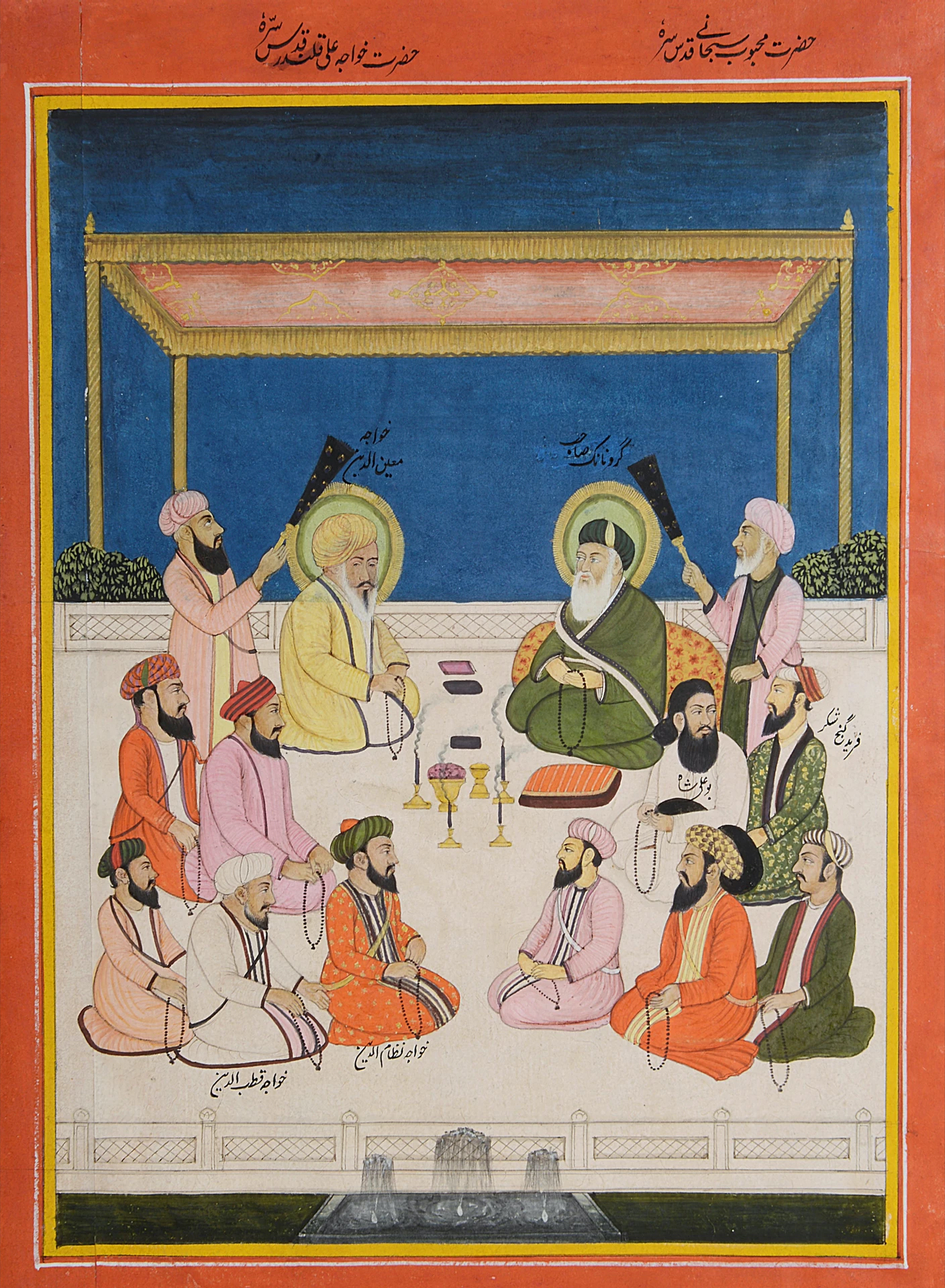
A meeting of Sufi saints with Guru Nanak, gouache with gold on paper, circa 19th century.

Many Sikhs believe that Nanak's message was divinely revealed, as his own words in Guru Granth Sahib state that his teachings are as he has received them from the Creator Himself. The critical event of his life in Sultanpur, in which he returned after three days with enlightenment, also supports this belief. In the past, scholarship tended to claim that Nanak's movement was a kind of amalgamation of both Islam and Hinduism but recent scholarship has moved away from this idea, viewing the movement instead in the context of mediaeval Indian society at the time with the ongoing Sant and Bhakti movements, with some Islamic influence. The framing of Nanak's religion being "syncretic" has also been criticized by James R. Lewis, due to how ambiguous it is and how the term has been selectively used to describe Sikhism in academia despite evidence of syncretism being widespread across religious traditions.

Many modern historians give weight to his teachings' linkage with the pre-existing bhakti, sant, (Note: "In its earliest stage Sikhism was clearly a movement within the Hindu tradition; Nanak was raised a Hindu and eventually belonged to the Sant tradition of northern India." (McLeod 2019)) and wali of Hindu/Islamic tradition. Scholars state that in its origins, Nanak and Sikhism were influenced by the nirguni ('formless God') tradition of the Bhakti movement in medieval India. (Note: "Historically, Sikh religion derives from this nirguni current of bhakti religion." (Lorenzen 1995, pp. 1–2)) However, some historians do not see evidence of Sikhism as simply an extension of the Bhakti movement. Sikhism, for instance, disagreed with some views of Bhakti saints Kabir and Ravidas.

The roots of the Sikh tradition are perhaps in the sant-tradition of India whose ideology grew to become the Bhakti tradition. (Note: "Technically this would place the Sikh community's origins at a much further remove than 1469, perhaps to the dawning of the Sant movement, which possesses clear affinities to Guru Nanak's thought sometime in the tenth century. The predominant ideology of the Sant parampara in turn corresponds in many respects to the much wider devotional Bhakti tradition in northern India." (Fenech 2014, p. 35)) Fenech (2014) suggests that:

Indic mythology permeates the Sikh sacred canon, the Guru Granth Sahib and the secondary canon, the Dasam Granth and adds delicate nuance and substance to the sacred symbolic universe of the Sikhs of today and of their past ancestors. (Note: "Few Sikhs would mention these Indic texts and ideologies in the same breadth as the Sikh tradition, let alone trace elements of their tradition to this chronological and ideological point, despite the fact that the Indic mythology permeates the Sikh sacred canon, the Guru Granth Sahib and the secondary canon, the Dasam Granth, and adds delicate nuance and substance to the sacred symbolic universe of the Sikhs of today and of their past ancestors." (Fenech 2014, p. 36))

Roopinder Singh argues that Nanak himself influenced the Bhakti movement. Prior to Nanak, most of the Bhakti writings emphasize the sargun (God with form) conceptualization of divinity, however due to the influence of Nanak's teachings, later Bhakti authors focused more heavily on nirguna (God without form). Furthermore, Nanak differed from the earlier bhagats as he founded his own community at Kartarpur and established congregations, known as sangats, to spread his teachings.

== Artwork ==
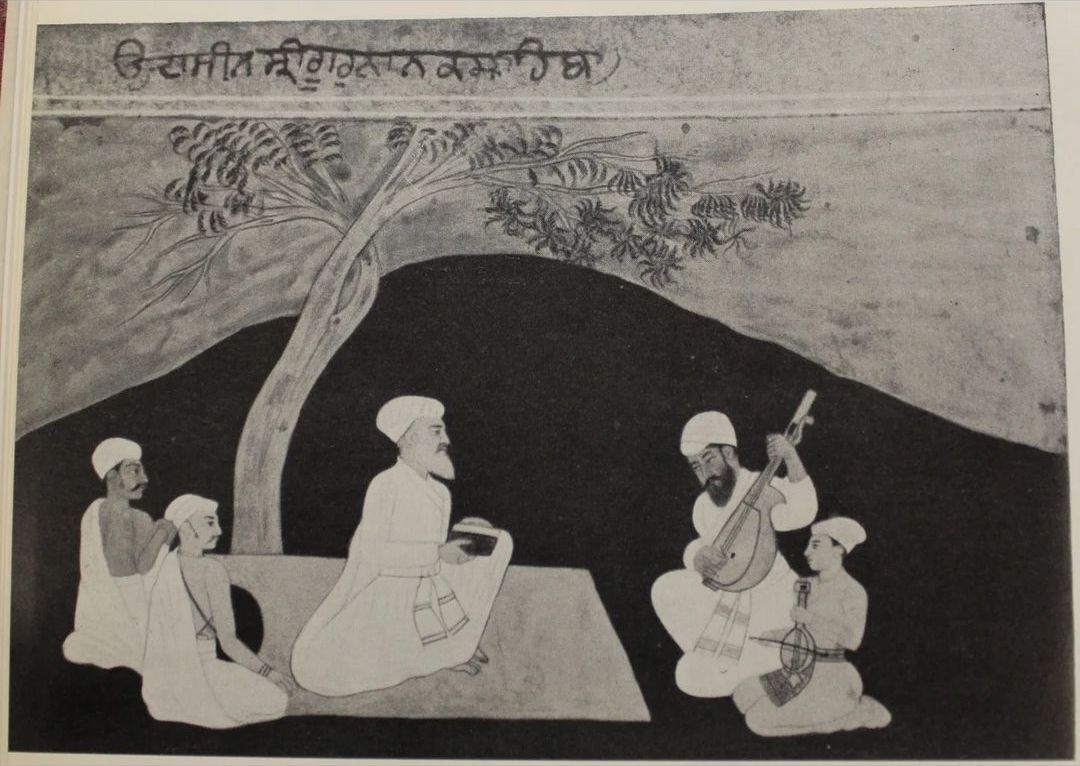
Miniature painting of Guru Nanak listening to musicians, circa 1680

No contemporary artwork of Guru Nanak is known to exist, however it is known he wore a seli (skein of twisted, woolen thread), topi (head-cap), chola (cloak), and kharawan (wooden sandals), and rudraksha mala (prayer beads), some of which is maintained and preserved as artefacts in collections, especially held by descendants of the gurus. The earliest extant or known depictions come from the second half of the 17th century, such as from the Ram Rai Darbar collection or Janamsakhis. Early portraitures tended to be influenced by the Mughal tradition (with Nanak being depicted either as a Muslim saint or sufi or as a Hindu ascetic) while the Janamsakhis were influenced by the Rajput tradition (with Nanak being portrayed exclusively as a Muslim saint). Out of the Pahari artists, only the artists associated with the Mankot court in the Pahari Hills depicted Nanak as a Hindu saint. A late 17th century painting of Nanak was published by Randhawa (1971). In Sikh art, the guru is depicted as a figure that blurs the lines between Hinduism and Islam, being usually shown haloed, in old-age with a white-beard, his eyes shown in a state of meditation, and with an Ik Onkar glyph imprinted on his right palm. Historical paintings of Nanak can be found in the Guler collection, the collection of the Government Museum and Art Gallery in Chandigarh, and the Bagrian family's collection.

== Legacy ==
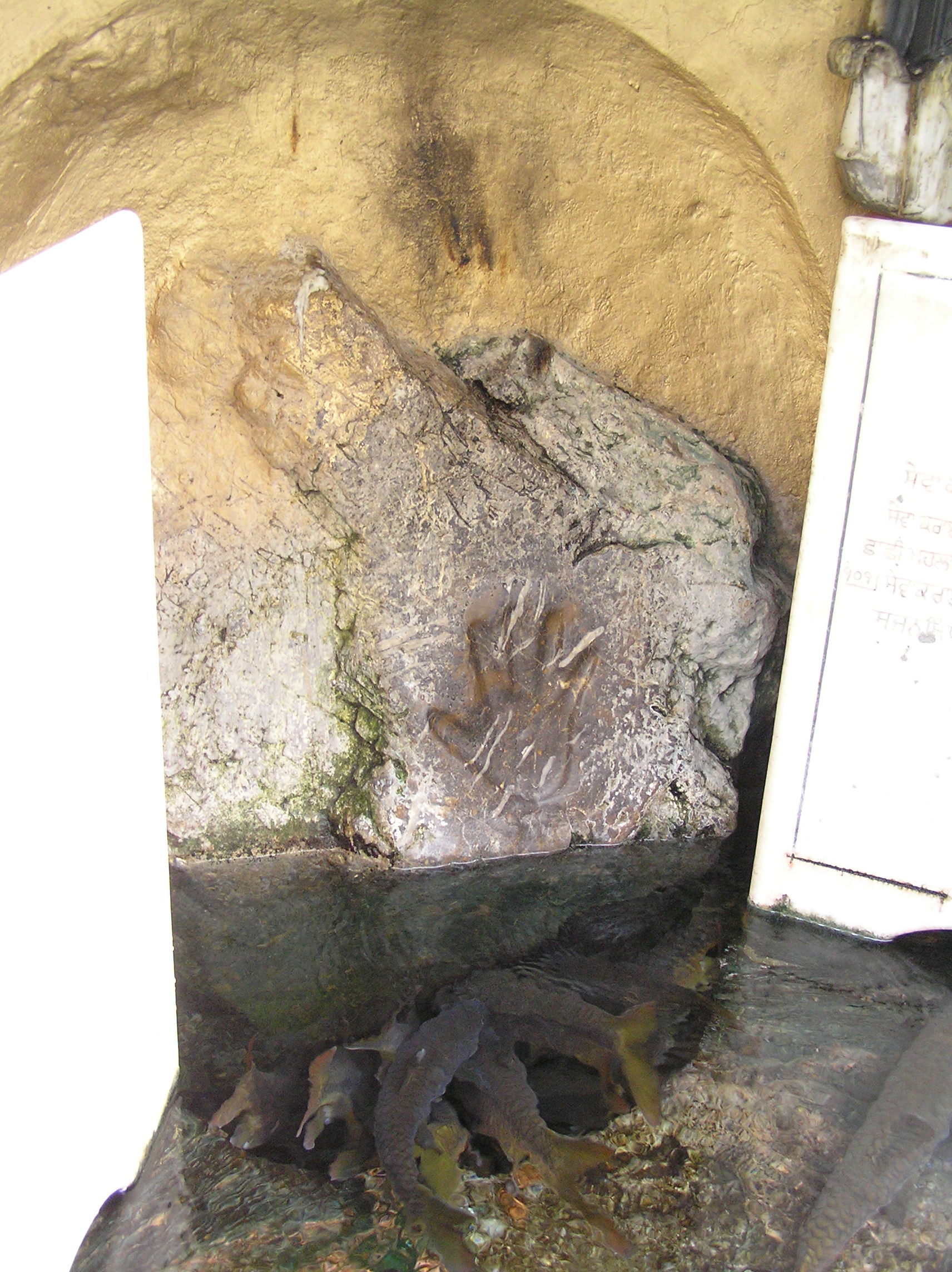
Guru Nanak's handprint is believed to be preserved on a boulder at the Gurdwara Panja Sahib in Hasan Abdal, Pakistan.

Nanak is the founder of Sikhism. The fundamental beliefs of Sikhism, articulated in the sacred scripture Guru Granth Sahib, include faith and meditation on the name of the one creator; unity of all humankind; engaging in selfless service, striving for social justice for the benefit and prosperity of all; and honest conduct and livelihood while living a householder's life.

The Guru Granth Sahib is worshipped as the supreme authority of Sikhism and is considered the final and perpetual guru of Sikhism. As the first guru of Sikhism, Nanak contributed a total of 974 hymns to the book.

According to Nikky-Guninder Kaur Singh, Guru Gobind Singh officializing the Khalsa in 1699 was an attempt to return to the egalitarian ideals that Guru Nanak had established at Kartarpur. The changing course of the Ravi River eventually washed away Nanak's mausoleum. Guru Nanak's son saved the urn containing his ashes and reburied it on the left bank of the river, where a new habitation was formed, the Dera Baba Nanak. Talwandi Rai Bhoe (now known as Nankana Sahib), where Nanak spent his early-years, had been a deserted and abandoned habitation until Diwan Kaura Mal sponsored the construction of holy-tanks (sarovars) and memorial gurdwaras there in 1750, which had generous land holdings given to them by Kaura Mal, which formed the estate of Nankana Sahib until partition of Punjab in 1947.

== Guru Nanak in other religions ==
=== In the Bahá'í Faith ===
In a letter, dated 27 October 1985, to the National Spiritual Assembly of the Bahá'ís of India, the Universal House of Justice stated that Nanak was endowed with a "saintly character" and that he was:

...inspired to reconcile the religions of Hinduism and Islám, the followers of which religions had been in violent conflict.... The Bahá'ís thus view Guru Nanak as a 'saint of the highest order'.

=== In Hinduism ===
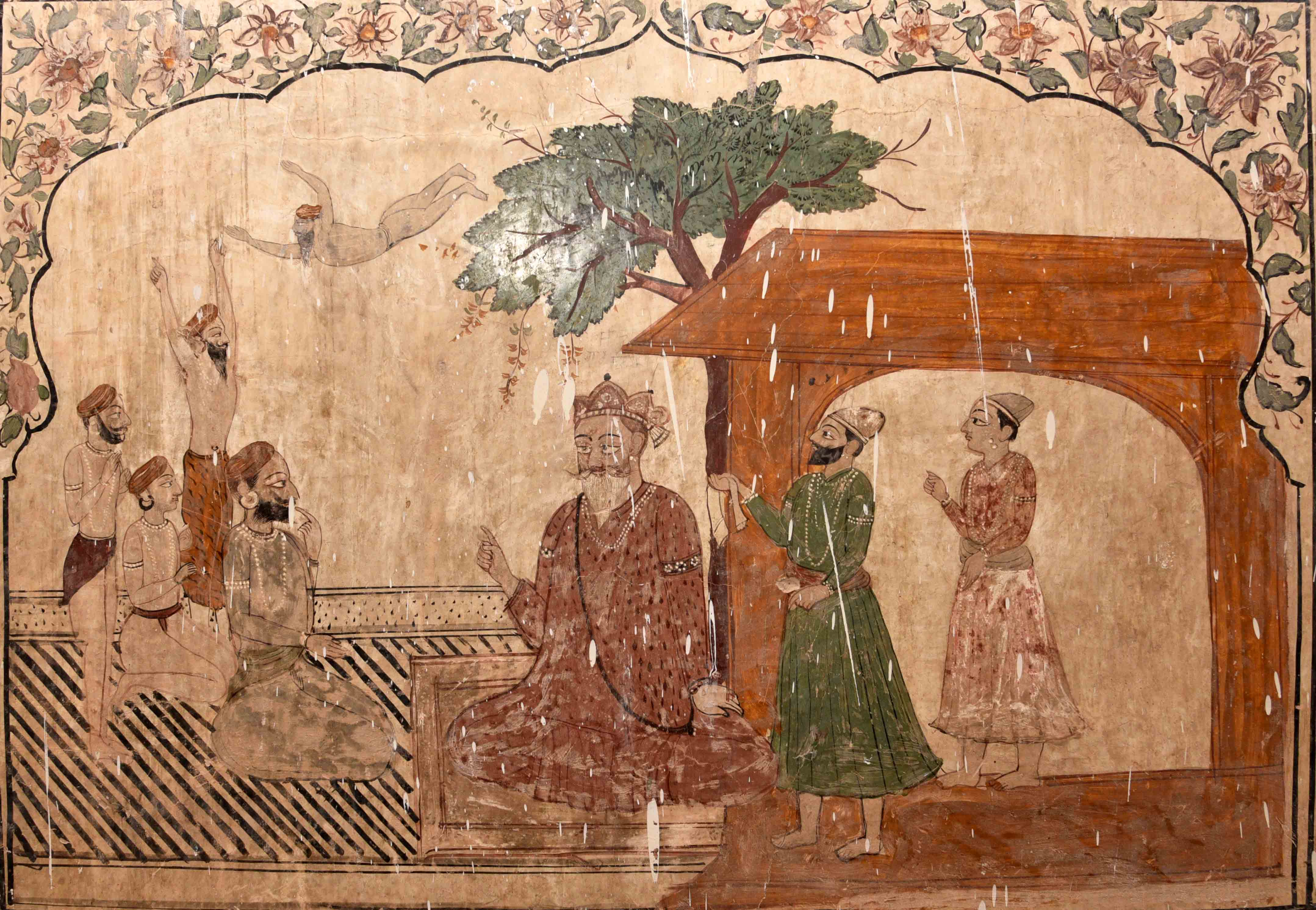
Mural of Guru Nanak from a Hindu temple in Jammu

Guru Nanak is also highly influential amongst Punjabi Hindus and Sindhi Hindus, the majority of whom follow Nanakpanthi teachings. The Dadupanthis (such as Raghodas) hold Nanak in high regard, including him in their exhaustive list of sants and bhagats, produced in 1660, 1717, or 1720. Nanak's works are included in the compositions by the sect, along with those by Dadu and some Naths and Shaivas.

=== In Tibetan Buddhism and Bon ===
Trilochan Singh claims that, for centuries, Tibetans have been making pilgrimages to the Golden Temple shrine in Amritsar to pay homage to Guru Nanak's memory. However, Tibetans seem to have confused Nanak with the visit of Padmasambhava centuries earlier, and have superimposed details of Padmasambhava onto Nanak out of reverence (believing the essence of both figures is one and the same) or mistaken chronology. (Note: Padmasambhava is alternatively known as 'Guru Rinpoche'.) According to Tibetan scholar Tarthang Tulku, many Tibetans believe Guru Nanak was an incarnation of Padmasambhava. Both Buddhist and Bon Tibetans made pilgrimages to the Golden Temple in Amritsar, however they revered the site for different reasons.

Between 1930 and 1935, the Tibetan spiritual leader, Khyungtrül Rinpoche (Khyung-sprul Rinpoche), travelled to India for a second time, visiting the Golden Temple in Amritsar during this visit. Whilst visiting Amritsar in 1930 or 1931, Khyung-sprul and his Tibetan entourage walked around the Golden Temple while making offerings. Khyung-sprul referred to the Golden Temple as "Guru Nanak's Palace" (Tibetan: Guru Na-nig-gi pho-brang). Khyung-sprul returned to the Golden Temple in Amritsar for another time during his third and final visit to India in 1948.

Several years later after the 1930–31 visit of Khyung-sprul, a Tibetan Bonpo monk by the name of Kyangtsün Sherab Namgyel (rKyang-btsun Shes-rab-rnam rgyal) visited the Golden Temple at Amritsar and offered the following description:

"Their principal gshen is the Subduing gshen with the 'bird-horns'. His secret name is Guru Nanak. His teachings were the Bon of Relative and Absolute Truth. He holds in his hand the Sword of Wisdom . . . At this holy place the oceanic assembly of the tutelary gods and buddhas . . . gather like clouds"

— Kyangtsün Sherab Namgyel

=== In Islam ===
==== Ahmadiyya ====
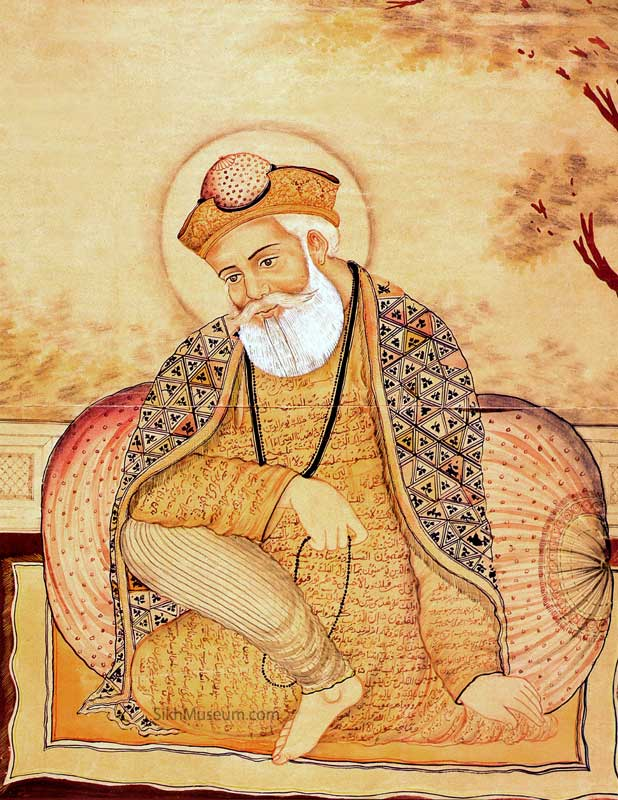
19th century painting depicting Guru Nanak wearing a chola (robe) with Perso-Arabic inscriptions

The Ahmadiyya Muslim Community considers Guru Nanak to have been a Muslim saint and that Sikhism derived from Sufism. They believe Guru Nanak sought to educate Muslims about the "real teachings" of Islam. Writing in 1895, Mirza Ghulam Ahmad defended Nanak from the accusations that had been made by the Arya Samajist Dayananda Saraswati, and asserted that Nanak was a Muslim. According to Abdul Jaleel, Nanak being a Muslim is supported by a chola inscribed with Quranic verses that is attributed to having belonged to him.

==== Ismailism ====
While there is no consensus on the issue of Guru Nanak's faith prior to the advent of Sikhism, one largely overlooked theory proposed by Dominique Sila-Khan in her works, Crossing the Threshold: Understanding Religious Identities in South Asia (2004) and Conversions and Shifting Identities (1997), argues that Guru Nanak was neither Hindu nor Sufi Muslim in the 'mainstream' sense, but rather, a Nizari Ismaili Muslim prior to Sikhism’s creation.

== In popular culture ==
- A Punjabi movie was released in 2015 named Nanak Shah Fakir, which is based on the life of Nanak, directed by Sartaj Singh Pannu.
- Allegory: A Tapestry of Guru Nanak's Travels is a 2021–22 docuseries about Nanak's travels in nine different countries.

== Gallery ==
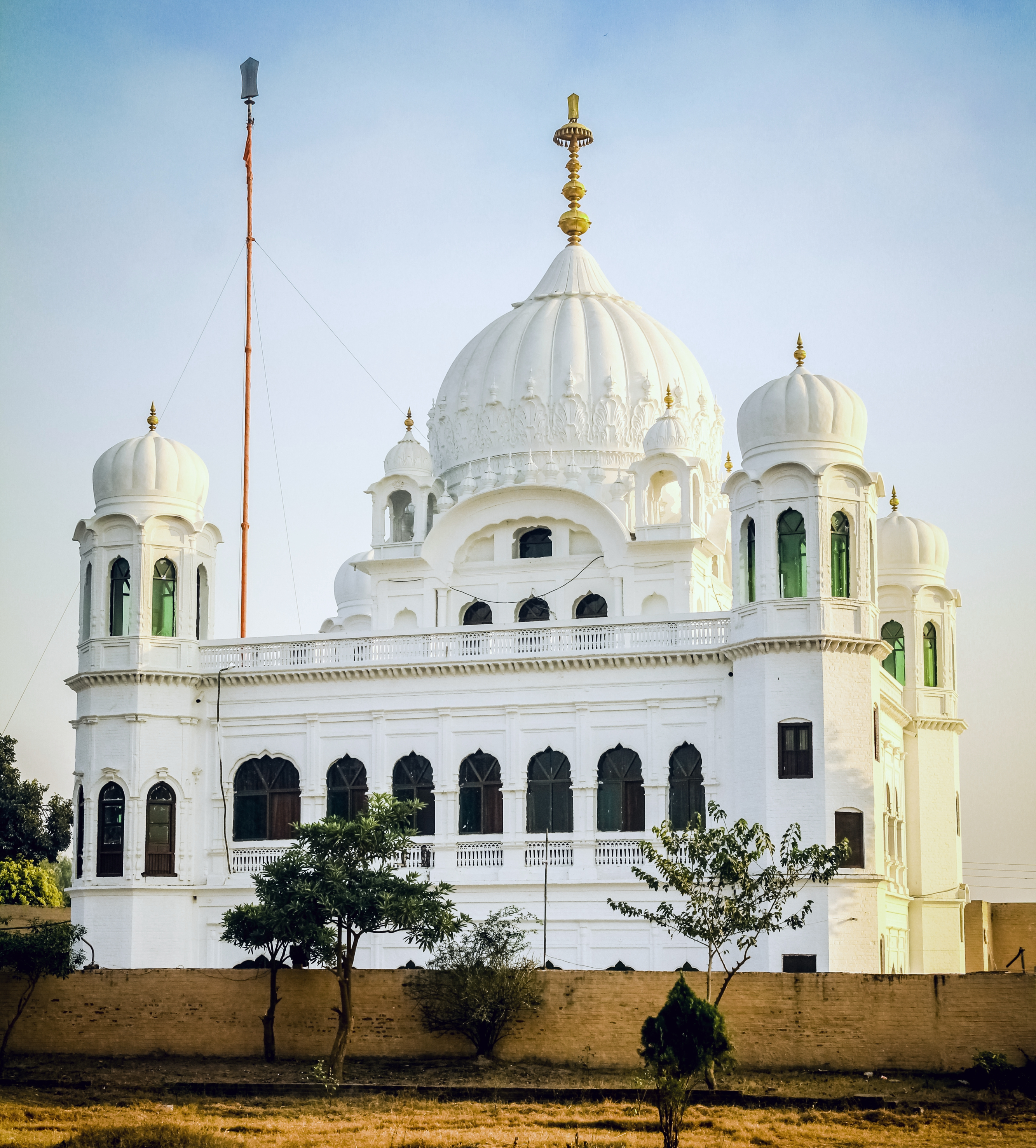
Gurdwara Darbar Sahib Kartar Pur in Narowal, Pakistan, marks the site where Guru Nanak is said to have died.

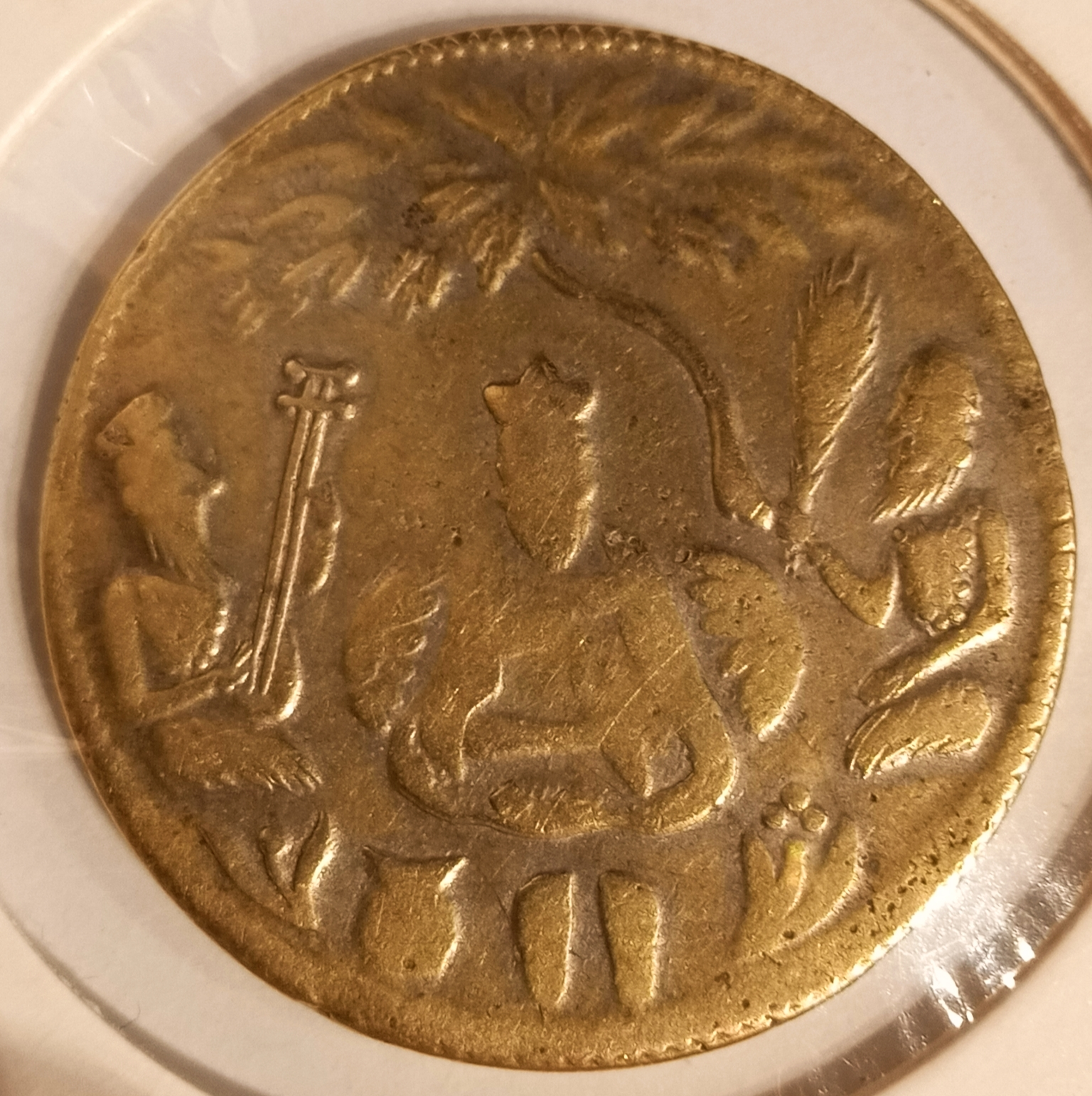
Temple-token from 1747 CE depicting Guru Nanak with his two disciples, Bhai Mardana and Bhai Bala waving a chaur (fly-whisk) as a mark of respect.

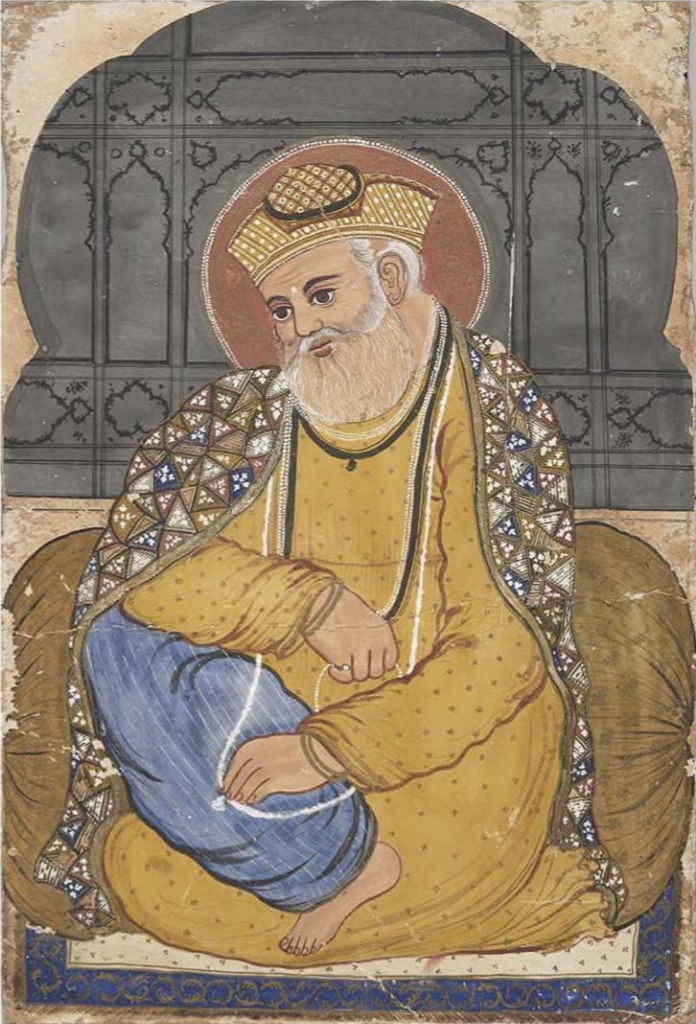
Portrait of Guru Nanak, the first Guru, 19th century.

== See also ==
- Bebe Nanaki – Elder sister of Guru Nanak (c. 1464–1518)
- Fatehabad, Punjab – Town in Punjab State, India
- Nanakshahi calendar – Calendar used in Sikhism
- List of places named after Guru Nanak Dev
- 'Walking With Nanak Paperback book about Travels (Udasis) of Guru Nanak ( May 16, 2023)by Haroon Khalid

== Notes ==
Preceded by —	Sikh Guru; 20 August 1507 – 7 September 1539	Succeeded by Guru Angad
