= Nirgun and Sargun =

Philosophical concept in Sikhism

Nirgun and Sargun is terminology used within Sikhism to refer to the ineffable (nirgun) and the manifest (sargun) nature of God. There is no dichotomy in the nirgun and sargun nature of God, as there only One (Ik Onkar).

"He Himself is formless, and also formed; the One Lord is without attributes, and also with attributes."

— SGGS. Ang 250

== In the Guru Granth Sahib ==
Before creation, God existed all alone as Nirgun in a state of Sunn Samadhi, deep meditation, as says Guru Nanak.

"There was darkness for countless years.

There was neither earth nor sky; there was only Its Will.

There was neither day nor night, neither sun nor moon.

They (God) were in deep meditation.

There was nothing except Itself."

— SGGS. Ang 1035

Then God willed, created the universe, and diffused into nature as Sargun.

== In Indian philosophy ==
The Sikh view of the dual nature of Absolute God runs parallel to Shankara's Vedic (Saguna and Nirguna) Brahman conception, as well as the tradition of Indian philosophy in general.

Within Hinduism, they are adjectives, indicating Brahman and its transcendence of all qualities, properties, and predicates (nirguna), or Brahman as possessing qualities (saguna). Advaita sees Nirguna Brahman as the ultimate reality.

== See also ==
- Waheguru
- Ik Onkar
- Monotheism
