= Sikhism in Russia =

Minority religion in Russia

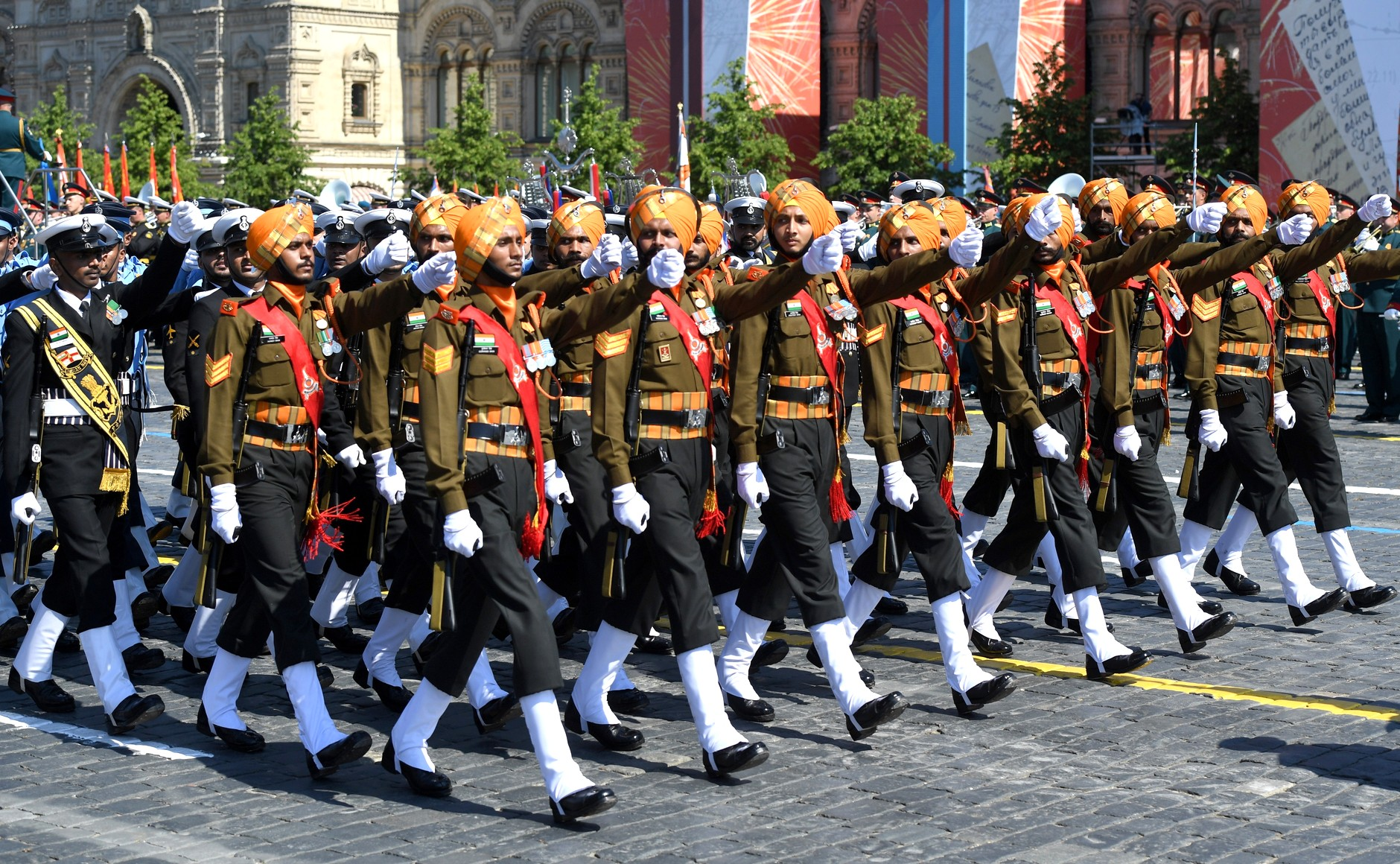
- The Sikh Light Infantry regiment of the Indian Army marching in the 2020 Moscow Victory Day Parade.

Total population
- ~1,000

Regions with significant populations
- Moscow

Languages
- Punjabi • Russian

Sikhism is a minority religion in Russia, with an estimated population of under one thousand adherents. There is one gurdwara in Moscow, Russia.

== History ==
Guru Nanak is traditionally locally known as Nanak Kadamdar in Russia. Sikh students were invited to study in the Soviet Union through cultural exchange programs starting in the 1950s, during which time they were granted temporary resident status. Sikhs that supported Communism were permitted to immigrate to the Soviet Union. Most Sikh immigrants to the Soviet Union worked in radio and publishing, often in the distribution of Indian-language media. Cultural exchange programs declined following the dissolution of the Soviet Union in 1991, but immigration numbers began to trend upward again by the late 1990s. However, Sikhs make up less than 2% of Indian students in Russia as of 2020.

Prior to the construction of a gurdwara, Sikhs in Moscow would meet to worship at a rented canteen hall. The Moscow Gurdwara Committee was registered in 1996, and the Gurdwara Nanak Darbar was established as a place of worship for Sikhs in 2005 by the Afghan Sikh community. Immigration from Afghanistan increased the population of Sikhs during the 2010s.

== Sikh community ==
As of 2020, the number of Sikhs in Russia is estimated to be between 300 and 1,000, and a significant portion of this population is made up of Afghan refugees. Sikhs in Moscow commonly work as traders, selling products from India. The Gurdwara Nanak Darbar is the religious center for Sikhs in Moscow, though it is legally recognized as a "cultural center" as the government has never authorized the establishment of an official gurdwara. Approximately 100 Sikhs attend Sunday prayers here each week, though this number doubles during Gurpurb celebrations.

== See also ==
- Religion in Russia

== Bibliography ==
- Kahlon, Swarn Singh (2020). Sikhs in Continental Europe: From Norway to Greece and Russia to Portugal. ISBN 9781000294736.
