= Saguna Baug =

Tourist attraction near Neral, Raigad, Maharashtra

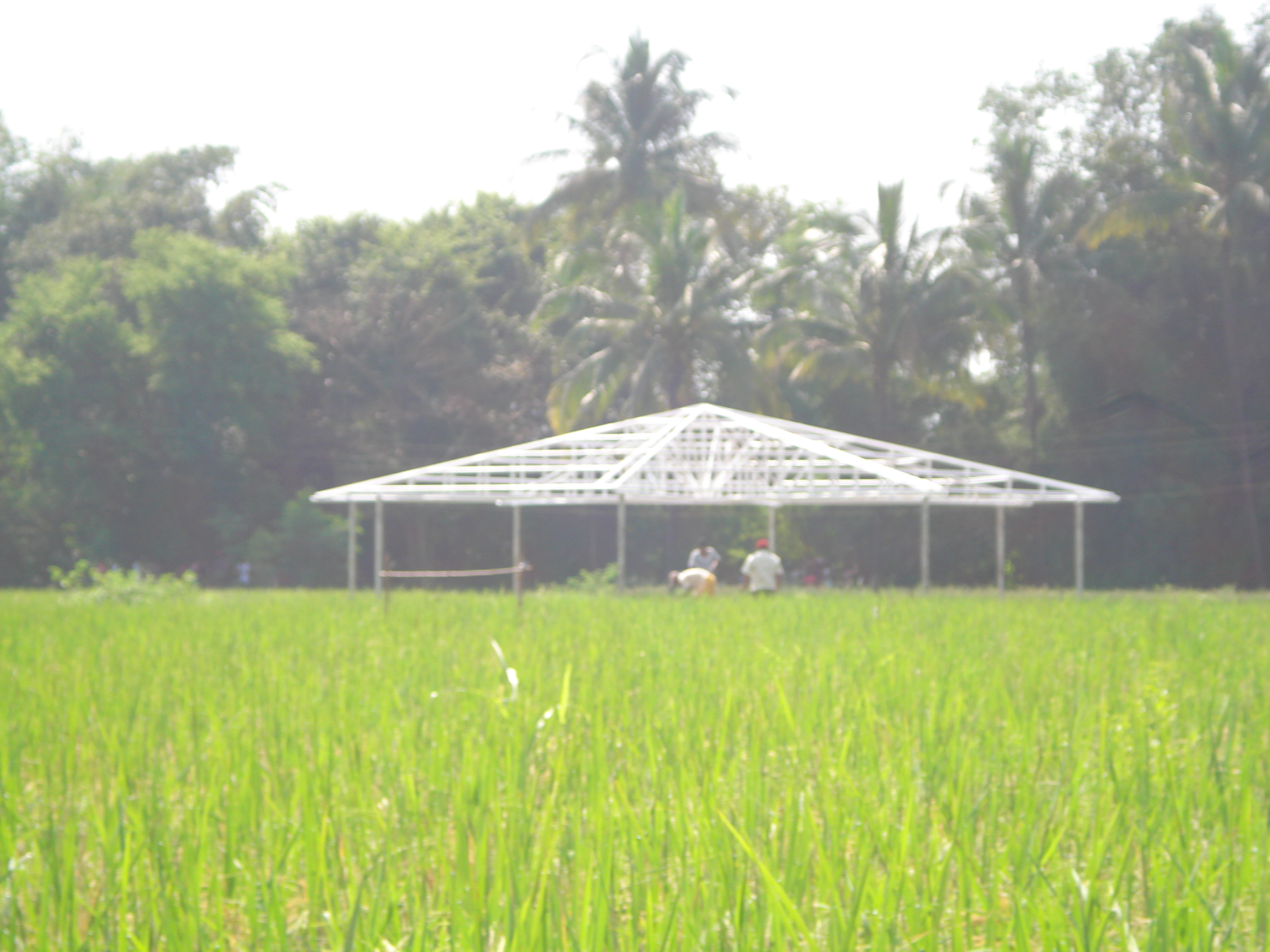
- Interactive map of Saguna Baug
- Location: Neral, Dist Raigad, India
- Coordinates: 19.041675°N 73.324359°E
- Opened: 1985
- Owner: Shri Harikaka Bhadsavle
- Slogan: Going Back to our Roots
- Operating season: Year Round
- Attendance: 40,000 p.a.
- Area: 22 acres (0.089 km^{2})

Saguna Baug is an agritourism centre and adventure park located in Neral, Raigarh, established in 1985. Saguna Baug Agri Tourism was given award for Rural Tourism on September 27, 2022 by Government of India on World Tourism Day .

Saguna Baug is an agricultural farm located at the foothills of Matheran. The farm is surrounded by Ulhas River. Before independence, Saguna Baug was called Saguna Dairy. The Agritourism covers the dairy vertical, which briefs cow milking, gobar gas plant.
