= Janamsakhis =

Sikh religious literary genre

Janamsakhi ਜਨਮਸਾਖੀ
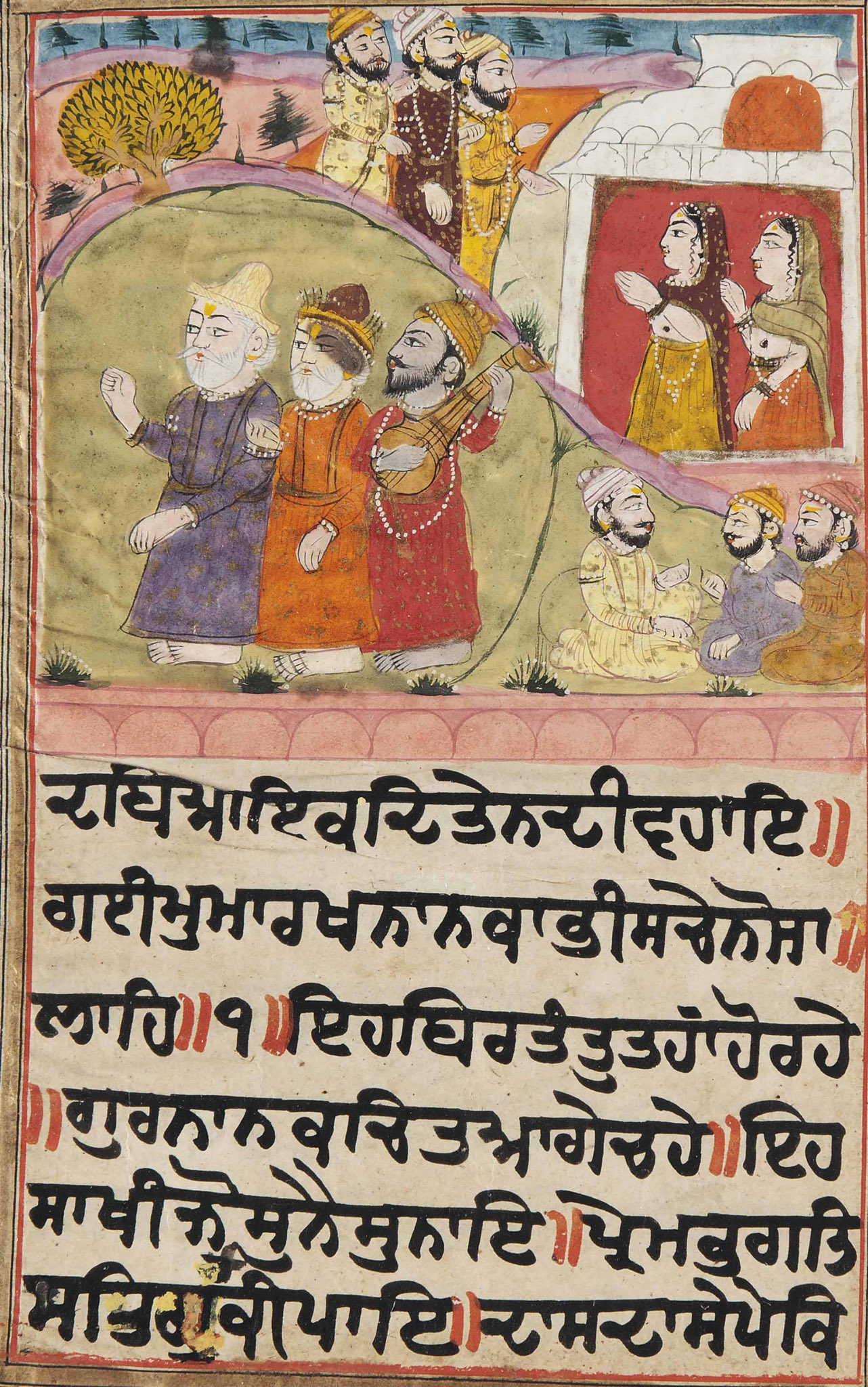
- Illustrated folio of Guru Nanak, Bala, Mardana and devotees from a Kashmiri Janamsakhi manuscript, circa 19th century.

Information
- Religion: Sikhism
- Author: Various
- Period: Late 16th century to 19th century
- Chapters: Three sections: childhood of Nanak; travels of Nanak; settled life of Nanak

The Janamsakhis (Punjabi: ਜਨਮਸਾਖੀ, IAST: Janam-sākhī, lit. 'birth stories'), are popular hagiographies of Guru Nanak, the founder of Sikhism. Considered by scholars as semi-legendary biographies, they were based on a Sikh oral tradition of historical fact, homily, and legend, with the first janamsakhi were composed between 50 and 80 years after his death. Many more were written in the 17th and 18th century. The largest Guru Nanak Prakash, with about 9,700 verses, was written in the early 19th century by Kavi Santokh Singh.

The four janamsakhi traditions that have survived into the modern era include the Bala, Miharban, Adi and Puratan versions. While each tradition offering their own perspectives, interpretations, and points of emphasis on the stories they report, they generally present Guru Nanak's life in three parts: the first part covering his childhood and early adulthood, the second part as an itinerant missionary after receiving the call from Akal Purakh ("Timeless Being," God), and the last part presents him as settled in Kartarpur, founding his community of believers.

Over 40 significant manuscript editions of the janamsakhis are known, all composed between the 17th and early-19th centuries, with most of these in the Puratan and Bala collections. The expanded version containing the hagiographies of all ten Sikh Gurus is the popular Suraj Prakash by Santokh Singh. This poetic janamsakhi is recited on festive occasions in Sikh Gurdwaras, Sikh ceremonies and festivals.

== Overview ==
The janamsakhis present accounts of the life of Guru Nanak and his early companions, with varying degrees of supernatural elements among them, typical for hagiographic biographies; more important was his message of equality before God, regardless of social classifications, also emphasizing friendships with those of other religions and the welfare of women. As stories were told and retold, the ways they were combined crystallized into a small number of specific traditions.

=== Origin ===
The janamsakhi stories likely began through family and friends close to Guru Nanak, spreading to others. The earliest layer of what was to become the written tradition later was, according to McLeod, "authentic memories concerning actual incidents from the life of Nanak," in conjunction with the verses left by him in what would become the Adi Granth. The first janamsakhis were oral in nature and began spreading across the Punjab when news on Guru Nanak's exploits and fame started being passed around. They were first put to writing likely around the early 17th century. However, according to Pyar Singh the earliest dated extant janamsakhi manuscript is from 1588. Some scholars claim the Puratan Janamsakhi was first written by Sewa Das in 1588.

=== Sikh tradition ===
The janamsakhi have been historically popular in the Sikh community and broadly believed as true, historical biography of the founder of their religion. They have been recited at religious gatherings, shared as reverential fables with the young generation, and embedded in the cultural folklore over the centuries. Guru Nanak is deeply revered by the devout Sikhs, the stories in the janamsakhi are a part of their understanding of his divine nature and the many wonders he is believed to have performed.

=== Didactic texts ===
The early editions of the janamsakhi manuscripts are more than Guru Nanak's life story. They relate each story with a teaching in the hymn of the Sikh scripture and illustrate a fundamental moral or teaching. The earliest janamsakhi collections were structured to lucidly expound on Guru Nanak's teachings to the audience, relating accounts to the specific hymns of the Adi Granth. The early oral tradition reached remote areas away further from Kartarpur, presenting his life and teachings to those who had never met the Guru, and for following generations.

The dominant motif of the janamsakhi is not chronological or geographical accuracy, as history was not their concern, but the depiction of various themes of "the divine dispensation of Nanak, his concern for kindness, social cohesiveness, and his stress on divine unity and the consequent unity of humanity," revealing the beliefs, attitudes, and needs valued by the Sikh community of the age. Incorporating verses from Guru Nanak's works to illuminate his theological and ethical teachings in a biographical framework and in the idiom and style of myth and allegory, their quick, vigorous style would lend them to a popular oral tradition of moral instruction. Along with Indic mythologizing traditions of itihasa, which incorporated mythology, history, philosophy, and geography, the Janamsakhi tradition was also contemporary with the Sufi allegorical traditions about Muhammad (mu'jizat) and Muslim saints (karamat), during influence in the period of Islamic domination. In this milieu where spiritual figures were understood and remembered, the janamsakhis commemorated and expounded upon the teachings of Guru Nanak.

The janamsakhi may have been the early didactic texts in the Sikh tradition, including a teaching, a moral instruction along with an associated hymn found in the Sikh scripture, serving as pedagogical texts, sustaining Guru Nanak's message through time for the community that valued it. In order to convey Guru Nanak's teachings, the janamsakhis make extensive use of allegory, often with mythic elements to imbue meaning. Though the birth narrative of Nanak shares similarities with that of Christ, Buddha, and Krishna, he is depicted as having a normal birth, with a Muslim midwife, Daultan, beside Guru Nanak's mother Mata Tripta, implying interfaith harmony. Typically dangerous natural phenomena either protect Nanak or are mastered by him, as a cobra shades child Nanak as he sleeps, or a rolling boulder being stopped by his hand. In a parable placed in Mecca, during Guru Nanak's travels he fell with his feet towards the Kaaba, to which a Qadi objected, but when he tried to rotate his feet away from it, the Kaaba reorients in the direction of Guru Nanak's feet, attesting to the omnipresence of God and the internality of faith as opposed to the external. A parable also relays Guru Nanak's body vanishing after his death and left behind fragrant flowers, which Hindus and Muslims then divided, one to cremate and other to bury.

== Janamsakhi traditions ==
=== Main traditions ===
==== Sakhi Mahal Pehle Ki ====
Sakhi Mahal Pehle Ki was discovered by Piar Singh and McLeod, but remained unexamined and published until 2014 when Dr. S.S. Padam found multiple different manuscripts of the text across Punjabi universities and published them with examination. The text is now considered the oldest of the Janamsakhi tradition and the root source for the other Janamsakhis.

Sakhi Mahal Pehle Ki claims to be written by Seeha Upal of Sultanpur, a Sikh of Guru Amar Das. It is also written in prose contrary to other Janamsakhis and is written in an archaic form of the Majhi dialect. It does not follow a set chronological order and no sakhis are numbered nor appear with a heading. The text appears to be an incomplete draft. Sakhi Mahal Pehle Ki has been dated to 1570-1574, during the last few years of Guru Amar Das's guruship.

Scholars consider this Janamsakhi to have been used by authors of other traditions. Padam believes that Bhai Gurdas wrote his first Vaar to fill the believed gaps in Sakhi Mahal Pehle Ki. Dr. Kirpal Singh disagrees with this point believing Gurdas's tradition to be independent. Both do agree on other Janamsakhi traditions being based on Sakhi Mahal Pehle Ki.

Sakhi Mahal Pehle Ki puts the Guru's birth in Vaisakh 1469. The text goes into very little detail on Guru Nanak's travels outside of Sultanpur. He mostly accounts the Guru travelling around Sultanpur in great detail. Other travels are not described in much detail, and the author seems to be unaware of the geography outside of the general Punjab and rarely names places. Famous stories such as Guru Nanak's travels to Mecca, Medina, Baghdad, and conversations with Sidhs are missing and raises doubts on those events historicity.

==== Puratan janamsakhi ====
This janamsakhi tradition is one of the oldest, with the earliest extant manuscript of this tradition dating back to 1640. It is believed to have first been put pen to paper around 80 years after the passing of Nanak. Presenting a more concise, less fantastical account of Guru Nanak's life, its realistic account of Guru Nanak's life and lack of fantasy elements led to its prominence among the Singh Sabha.

The term Puratan janamsakhis means ancient janamsakhis and is generally used with reference to the composite work which was compiled by Bhai Vir Singh and first published in 1926. Of the still existing copies of the Puratan janamsakhis the two most important were the Colebrooke and Hafizabad versions. The first of these was discovered in 1872, the manuscript had been donated to the library of the east India company by H.T. Colebrooke and is accordingly known as the Colebrooke or Vailaitwali janamsakhi. Although there is no date on it the manuscript points to around 1635.

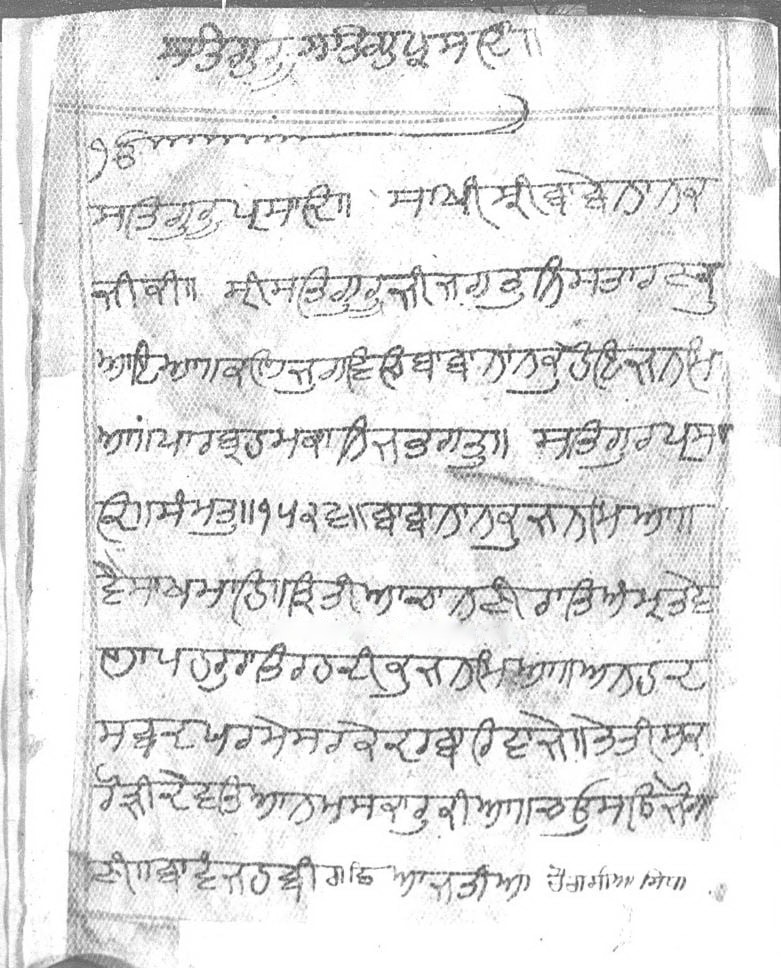
Walayat Wali Janamsakhi (Colebrooke manuscript), 1634

In the year 1883 a copy of a janamsakhi was dispatched by the India Office Library in London for the use of Dr. Trumpp and the Sikh scholars assisting him. (It had been given to the library by an Englishman called Colebrook; it came to be known as the Vilayat Vali or the foreign janamsakhi.) This janamsakhi was the basis of the accounts written by Trumpp, Macauliffe, and most Sikh scholars. Gurmukh Singh of the Oriental College, Lahore, found another janamsakhi at Hafizabad which was very similar to that found by Colebrook. Gurmukh Singh who was collaborating with Mr. Macauliffe in his research on Sikh religion, made it available to the Englishman, who had it published in November 1885.

According to the Puratan janamsakhi, Guru Nanak Dev Ji was born in the month of Vaisakh, 1469. The date is given as the third day of the light half of the month and the birth is said to have taken place during the last watch before dawn. His father Kalu was a khatri of the Bedi sub-cast and lived in a village Rai Bhoi di Talwandi; his mother's name is not given. When Guru Ji turned seven he was taken to a pundit to learn how to read. After only one day he gave up reading and when the pundit asked him why Guru Ji lapsed into silence and instructed him at length on the vanity of worldly learning and the contrasting value of the Divine Name of God. The child began to show disturbing signs of withdrawal from the world. He was sent to learn Persian at the age of nine but returned home and continued to sit in silence. Locals advised his father that Nanak should be married. This advice was taken and at the age of twelve a betrothal was arranged at the house of Mula of the Chona sub-caste. Sometime later Nanak moved to Sultanpur where his sister Nanaki was married. Here he took up employment with Daulat Khan. One day Nanak went to the river and while bathing messengers of God came and he was transported to the divine court. There he was given a cup of nectar (amrita) and with it came the command Nanak, this is the cup of My Name (Naam). Drink it. This he did and was charged to go into the world and preach the divine Name.

==== Adi janamsakhi ====
The Adi tradition of janamsakhi, known as the Adi Sakhian (adi, meaning "first"; sakhian, plural of sakhi, meaning "anecdotes, stories, discourses, parables"), was first discovered by Mohan Singh Diwana in Lahore, pre-partition Punjab. The manuscript he discovered dated to 1701 but Harbans Singh believes the tradition may date back to the mid-17th century but unlikely to originate earlier than that period. More manuscripts of this tradition have been discovered since the finding of the initial manuscript. It shows influence from the Puratan tradition (particularly a few anecdotes or stories and discourses) and another unknown source, that has yet come to light, that also influenced the B40 janamsakhi. It differs from the Puratan tradition in that it does not present Guru Nanak's travels as four separate journeys. The portion covering the travels of Nanak is believed to have been sourced from the yet undiscovered manuscript.

==== Bhai Bala janamsakhi ====
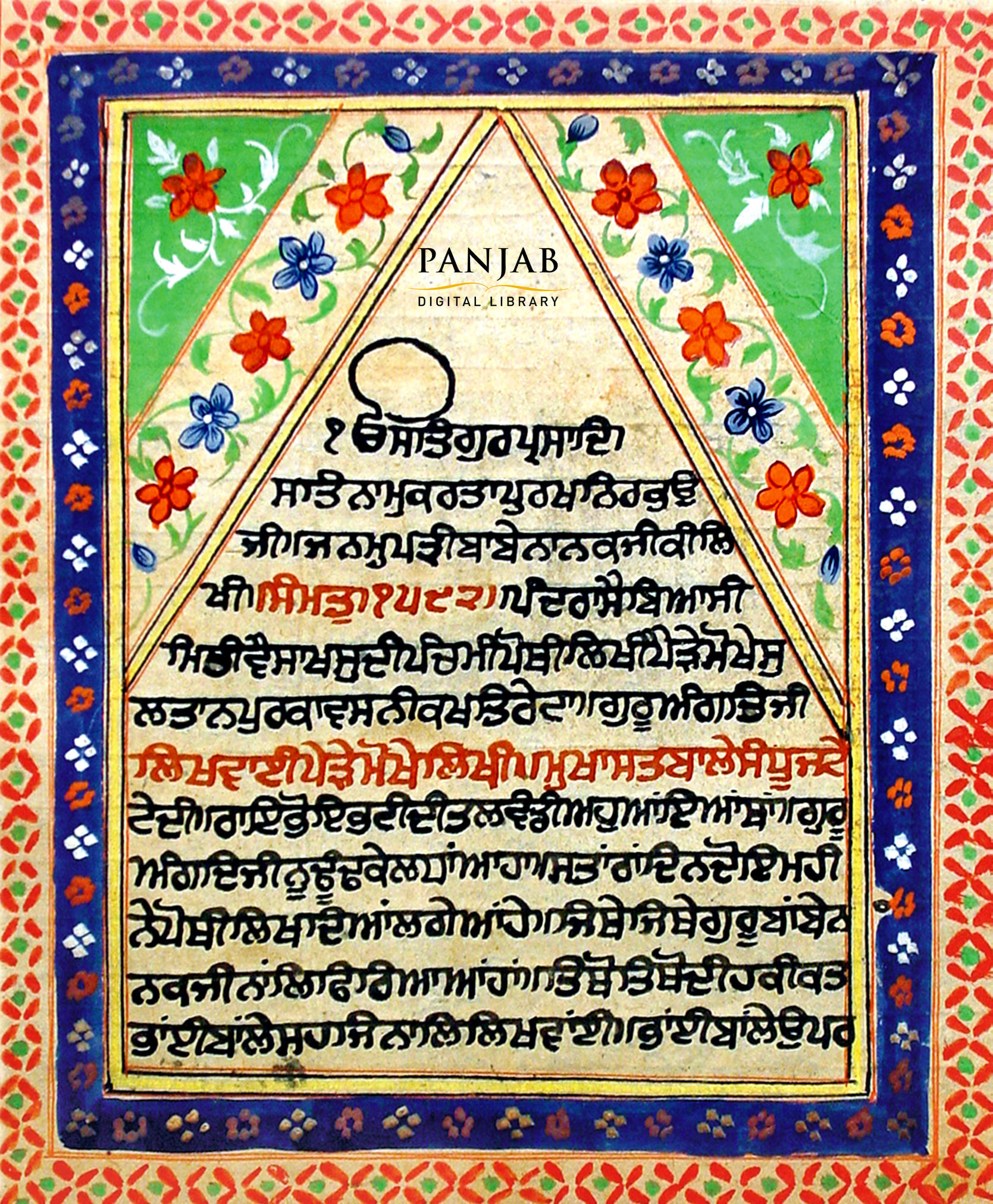
Decorated opening folio of a manuscript of the Bhai Bala Janamsakhi tradition

The Bala janamsakhi claims to be written by Bhai Bala, an alleged contemporary of Guru Nanak, and was supposedly written at the request of Guru Angad.

There are reasons to doubt this contention as Guru Angad, who is said to have commissioned the work and was also a close companion of the Guru in his later years, was, according to Bala's own admission, ignorant of the existence of Bala.

The oldest accepted manuscript of the Bala janamsakhi was written by Gorakh Das in 1658, but the actual date is believed to be earlier.

It is generally believed this janamsakhi were written by Hindalis as in a number of stories Guru Nanak praises Baba Hindal. Some are of the belief that this is a contemporary work and was later edited by the Hindalis. One of the people who subscribed to this belief was Santhok Singh the author of the famed Suraj Granth. Santhok Singh wrote Nanak Parkash based on the Bala janamsakhi with the goal of removing parts he believed were edited and added by the Hindalis.

Dr. Trilochan Singh counters some of the points raised against the Bala janamsakhi by stating that Mehma Parkash and Mani Singh's janamsakhi both mention Bhai Bala. Bala is further mentioned in Suchak Prasang Guru Ka by Bhai Behlo written during Guru Arjan Dev's time. Bhai Behlo says, “Bala discarded his body there, At the holy city of Khadaur, Angad, the master, performed the rites, Graciously with his own two hands.” He also raises the point that Bhai Bala's family is still living in Nankana Sahib and that Bala's samadhi exists in Khadaur. Singh claims the janamsakhi was written by Bhai Bala and is mostly authentic but was edited and changed by anti-Sikh sects.

In the first journey or udasi, Guru Nanak left Sultanpur towards eastern India and included, in the following sequence: Hakimpura →Lahore → Gobindwal → Fatehbad → Ram Tirath → Jahman → Chahal → Ghavindi → Khalra → Kanganwal → Manak Deke → Alpa → Manga → Eminabad → Sialkot → Sahowal → Ugoke → Pasrur → Deoka → Mitha Kotla → Chhanga Manga → Chuhnian → Hissar → Rohtak → Sirsa → Pehows → Thanesar → Kurushetra → Karnal → Panipat (Sheikh Sharaf) → Delhi (Sultan Ibrahim Lodi) → Hardwar → Allahabad → Banaras → Nanakmata → Kauru, Kamrup in Assam (Nur Shah) → Nagapattinam Port → Sri Lanka → Patna → Chittagong →Dibrugarh → Talvandi (twelve years after leaving Sultanpur) → Pak Pattan (Sheikh Ibrahim) → Goindval → Lahore → Kartarpur.

The second udasi was to the south of India with companion Bhai Mardana: Delhi → Ayodhya → Jagannath Puri → Rameswaram → Sri Lanka → Vindhya mountains → Narabad River → Ujjain → Saurashtra → Mathura

The third udasi was to the north: Kashmir → Mount Sumeru → Achal

The fourth udasi was to the west: Afghanistan → Persia → Baghdad → Mecca

==== Miharban janamsakhi ====
Of all the janamsakhi traditions this is probably the most neglected as it has acquired a disagreeable reputation. Sodhi Miharban who gives his name to the janamsakhi was closely associated with the Mina sect and the Minas were very hostile towards the Gurus around the period of Guru Arjan. The Minas were the followers of Prithi Chand, the eldest son of Guru Ram Das. Prithi Chand's behaviour was evidently unsatisfactory as he was passed over in favour of his younger brother, (Guru) Arjan Dev, when his father chose a successor. The Minas were a robber tribe and in Punjabi the word has come to mean someone who conceals his true evil intent. The Minas were subsequently execrated by Guru Gobind Singh and Sikhs were instructed to have no dealings with them. The sect is now extinct. It is said that it was due to this janamsakhi and its hostility towards the Gurus that prompted Bhai Gurdas' Varan account and the commission of the Gyan-ratanavali by Bhai Mani Singh.

The Miharban exegesis reflected strong Khatri affiliation, as opposed to the rising Jatt influence in the community at the time, leading to McLeod's assertion that the collection dated to later than its given date of 1828 CE, possibly in the late 19th century.

The first three sakhis recount the greatness of Raja Janak and describes an interview with God wherein Raja Janak is instructed that he is to return to the world once again to propagate His Name. Details of Guru Nanak's birth are given in the fourth sakhi and his father was Kalu, a Bedi and his mother Mata Tripta. The account of Guru Nanak learning to read from the pundit is also recounted here. After the interlude at Sultanpur Guru Nanak set out to Mount Sumeru. Climbing the mountain, the Guru found all nine Siddhas seated there – Gorakhnath, Mechhendranath, Isarnath, Charapatnath, Barangnath, Ghoracholi, Balgundai, Bharathari, and Gopichand. Gorakhnath asked the identity of the visitor and his disciple replied, "This is Nanak Bedi, a pir and a bhagat who is a householder." What follows is a lengthy discourse with the siddhas which ends with the siddhas asking what is happening in the evil age of Kali Yuga. The Guru responds with three slogans:

1. There is a famine of truth, falsehood prevails, and in the darkness of kaliyug men have become ghouls
2. The kaliyug is a knife, kings are butchers, dharma has taken wings and flown
3. Men give as charity the money they have acquired by sinful means

Attempts to change birth places, birth and death dates, and the level of spiritual prominence of the orthodox Gurus by rival claimants of Sikh guruship have been considered to be a source of divergence from the normative tradition. Such attempts, such as modification of the historically highly regarded janamsakhis written by Paida Mokha detailing Nanak's travels, by rival family members of Guru Arjan, who would start the Mina sect and the Miharban collection, would eventually prompt authoritative written traditions in response. The sectarian intent of the Miharban and Bala janamsakhis have been questioned by Sikh scholars, namely that in the case of the Hindalis, Hindal and Kabir are promoted at the expense of Nanak, who was depicted as having prophesied Hindal's arrival.

==== Bhai Mani Singh's janamsakhi ====
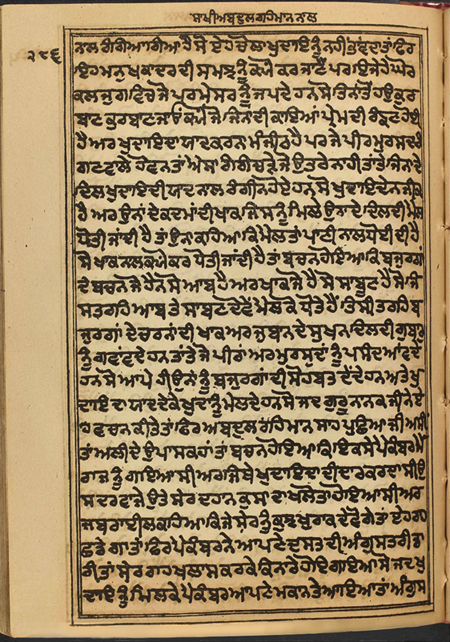
Folio of a manuscript of Bhai Mani Singh's Janamsakhi

The last major, and evidently the latest, tradition of janamsakhi is the Gyan-Ratanavali (also known as Bhagat Ratnavali) attributed to Bhai Mani Singh, who wrote it with the express intention of correcting heretical accounts of Guru Nanak when requested to do so by the Sikh congregation.

There are some doubts about the authenticity and author of this janamsakhi. Older manuscript of the Mani Singh janamsakhi have different dates for the death and birth of Guru Nanak compared to popular renditions. The language from this janamsakhi compared to Mani Singh's Sikhian di Bhagat Mal is noticeably different. No eighteenth century manuscript of this text exists. All of this has led some to doubt whether Mani Singh was the author and the reliability of this janamsakhi.

The work is an expansion of the first Vaar of Varan Bhai Gurdas. It shows influence from the Bhai Bala tradition. This janamsakhi tradition makes no mention of Bhai Bala amongst the list of Guru Nanak's close companions and associates.

=== Minor traditions ===
Various other more minor and obscure janamsakhi traditions are known. One such tradition is that of the B40, which contains influences of both the Puratan and Miharvan traditions. The Hindali sect had a janamsakhi version, known as the Hindaliya Janam Sakhi.

==== Women's oral Janamsakhis ====
Aside from literary Janamsakhis, there also exists a Janamsakhi tradition passed down orally by Sikh women which provide more information about the lives of girls and women during the period of the first Sikh guru. Particular emphasis and focus is placed on prominent Sikh female figures, their influences, and impact, such as Mata Tripta, Bebe Nanaki, and Mata Sulakhni. Whilst all Janamsakhis originally began circulating as oral stories originally and only began to be written down later on, there existed a male-orientated and female-orientated oral tradition, with the male stories having later been recorded and delegated to writing, whilst the female stories remained as an oral tradition and were sidelined and neglected. Whilst this women's oral tradition is in decline and is being gradually replaced with the more dominant, male-centric literary traditions, there do exist elderly Sikh women in certain villages of Jalandhar district, specifically the villages of Mahala and Bara Pind, where tellers of the women's oral janamsakhis can still be found. Interestingly, these oral stories passed down by Sikh women focus more on the domestic and family life of Nanak, with women playing much more prominent roles than the literary traditions. Many important figures in the literary traditions, such as Rai Bhullar or Jai Ram (Nanaki's husband), barely make a mention in the women's oral janamsakhis.

=== Critical scholarship ===
Max Arthur Macauliffe, a British civil servant, published his six volume translation of Sikh scripture and religious history in 1909. This set has been an early influential source of Sikh Gurus and their history for writers outside of India. Macauliffe, and popular writers such as Khushwant Singh who cite him, presented the Janamsakhi stories as factual, though Macauliffe also expressed his doubts on their historicity. Khushwant Singh similarly expresses his doubts, but extensively relied on the Janamsakhis in his A History of the Sikhs. Macauliffe interspersed his translation of the Sikh scripture between Janamsakhis-derived mythical history of the Sikh Gurus. Post-colonial scholarship has questioned Macauliffe's reliance on janamsakhis as "uncritical" and "dubious", though one that pleased the Sikh community.

On the basis of W. H. McLeod's critical methodology which included:

- dismissal of legendary, miraculous, or "unverifiable" elements;
- corroboration with external sources and
- corroboration with the Adi Granth;
- differences between different janamsakhi traditions and
- their reliability relative to each other;
- proximity of mentioned family members to Guru Nanak; and
- proximity of Guru Nanak to the Punjab region, which were given a greater degree of confidence;

McLeod placed each narrative into five categories: the established, the probable, the possible, the improbable, and the impossible. Out of 124 sakhis, he classified 37 as "probable" or "established," and 28 as "possible." Specifically looking for details "of importance" of Guru Nanak's life, he filled out just under one typeset page, though most sakhis are themselves brief at three to four pages. He considered the Miharban and earlier manuscripts of the Bala collections, belonging to the schismatic, now-extinct Mina and Hindali sects respectively, to have particularly dubious origins.

His approach "proved to be highly controversial," as it "angered many Sikhs" who saw him as "removing the vibrant life and message of their Guru from these texts," using incompatible Christian heuristic methodologies comparable to the Higher Criticism of the Gospels, through which Trilochan Singh contends that he would have set out to prove that that Guru Nanak himself had never existed, though failing to do so.

Throughout the early seventeenth and eighteenth century Janamsakhis, Nanak is consistently likened and considered tantamount to the Divine itself, though this has been downplayed among recent Sikh scholars.

== Janamsakhis of other Sikh gurus ==
Whilst the Janamsakhi literary genre arose to document the life of the first Sikh guru, Nanak, there also exists literature which was a later expansion of the Janamsakhi genre which details the lives of later gurus. There exists a Janamsakhi tradition which covers the life of Guru Amar Das, the third Sikh guru. The earliest surviving manuscript of Amar Das' Janamsakhi tradition dates to 1683. There also exists a Janamsakhi tradition covering the life of Guru Arjan, the fifth Sikh guru. The fifth guru's Janamsakhi tradition is recorded in an undated manuscript under the title of Prichha Mahala Panjve Ka. For Guru Har Rai, a manuscript covering his life was apparently written by Rup Kaur, it is known as Pothi Bibi Rup Kaur.

== Janamsakhi art ==
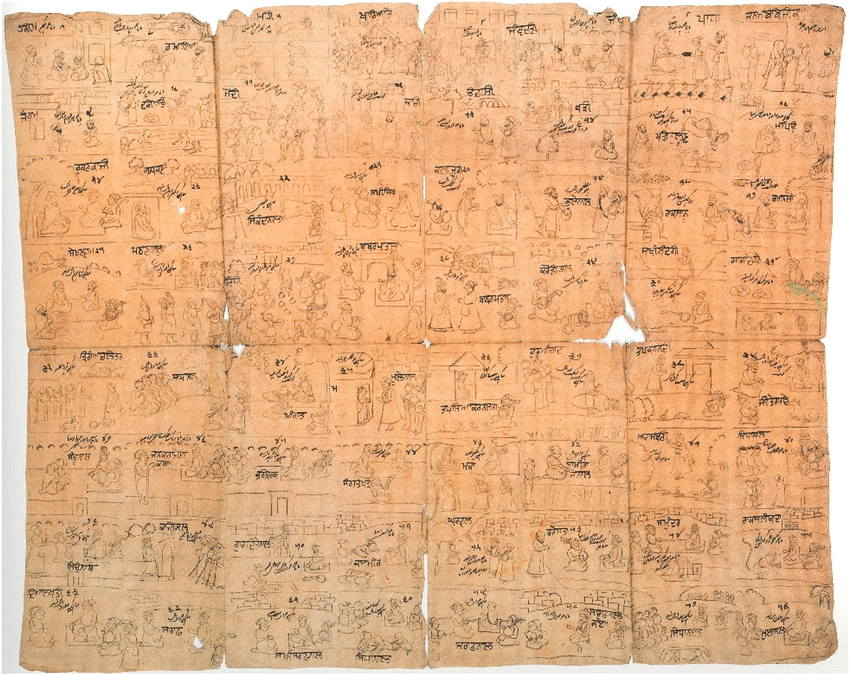
18th century preliminary janamsakhi sketches

The janamsakhi literature produced was often elaborately illustrated with paintings on the folios of the handwritten manuscripts, each depicting a life story of the first Guru. It is one of the earliest sources of Sikh art.

The earliest illustrated manuscripts are as follows:

- A manuscript of the Bhai Bala tradition held in the private collection of P. N. Kapoor of Delhi, containing 29 illustrations, dated to 1658
- A manuscript called the Bagharian manuscript, containing 42 illustrations, dated to 1724
- A manuscript called the B40 manuscript, containing 57 illustrations, dated to 1733. The patron, artist, and scribe of this work is known.

The art of illustrated Janamsakhi manuscripts declined following the introduction of the printing press in Punjab during the 1870s.

The mahant of the Guru Ram Rai Darbar complex in Dehradun has a collection of at-least 22 miniature paintings in the Mughal-style, which depict both Hindu and Sikh themes. It consists of 16 portraits, the portray the Sikh gurus (except for Guru Tegh Bahadur and Guru Gobind Singh), Kabir with his son Kamal, and Rama and Sita. Some of them depict Janamsakhi scenes. They are all dated to c. 1685, except for one of Guru Nanak which is dated to c. 1689. They were all likely commissioned by Ram Rai himself.

== Gallery ==
=== 1658 Janamsakhi ===
Images of manuscript paintings from the oldest extant or discovered illustrated Janamsakhi manuscript, which belongs to the Bhai Bala tradition, dated to 1658:

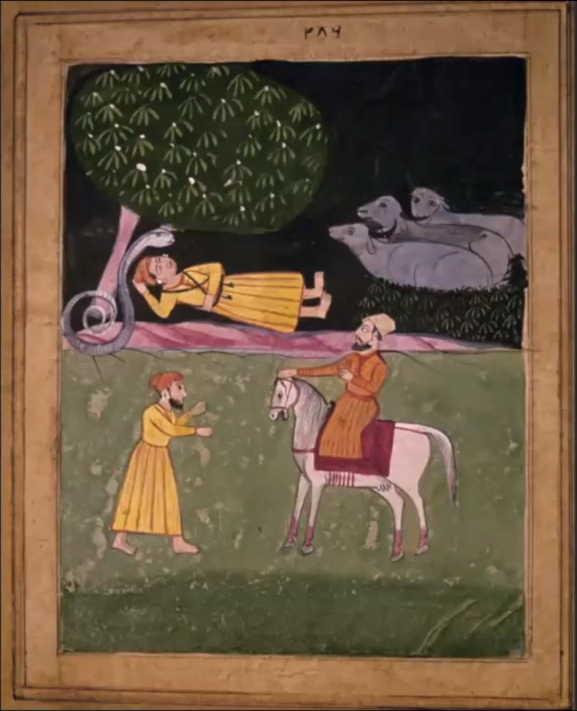
Guru Nanak being shaded by the cobra

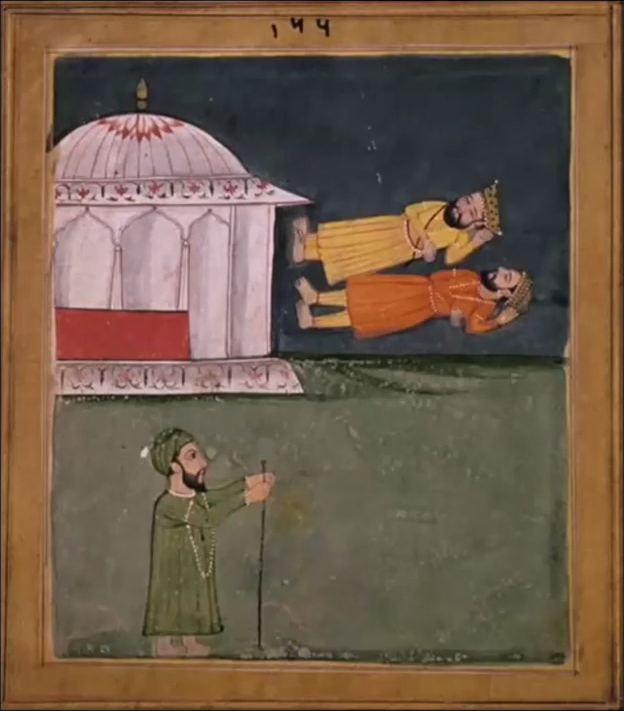
Guru Nanak placing his feet toward the Kaaba in Mecca

=== B40 Janamsakhi ===
Images of manuscript paintings from the third oldest illustrated Janamsakhi manuscript known (Bhai Sangu Mal MS, published in August 1733 CE, preserved at the British Library):

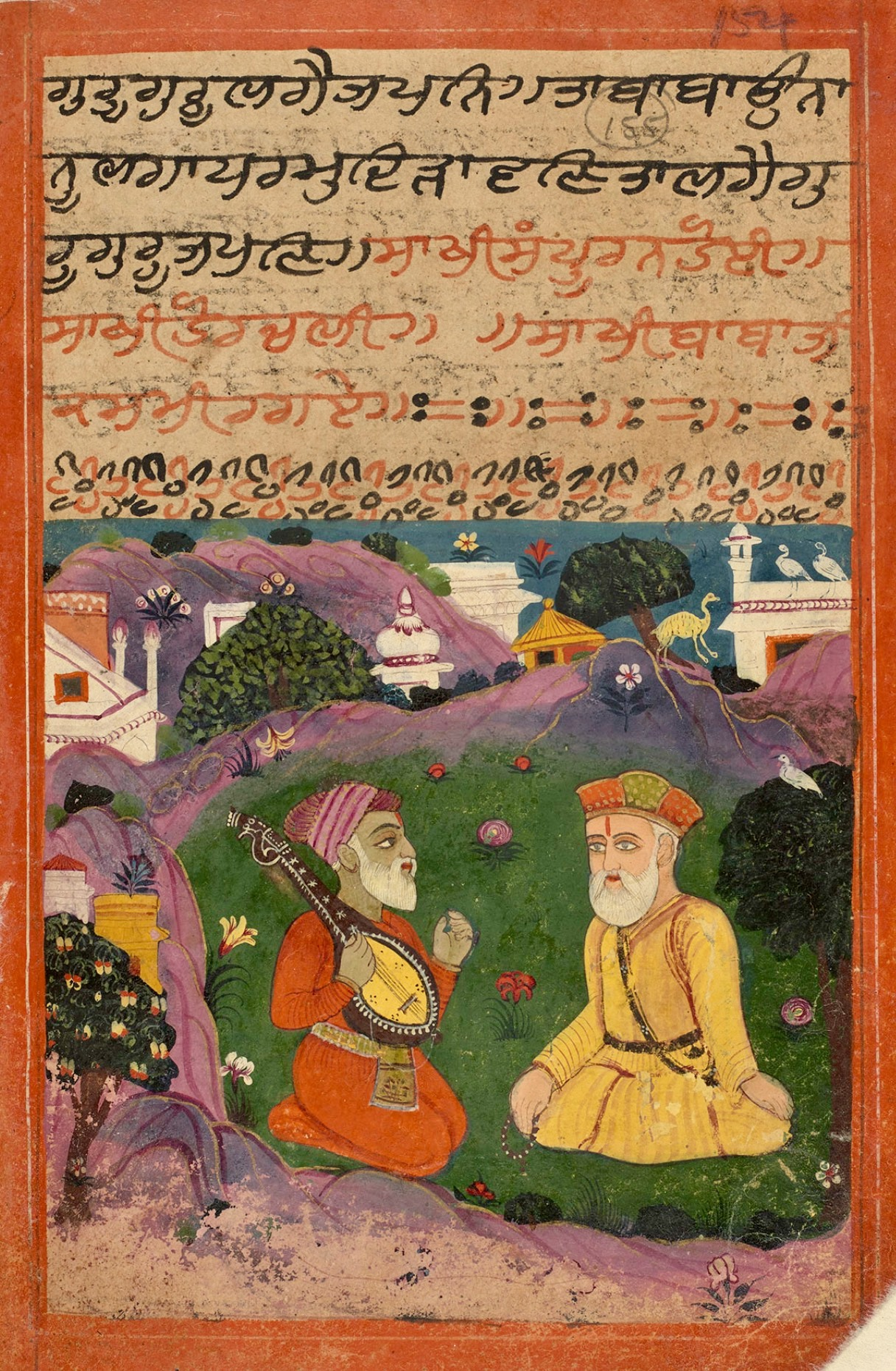

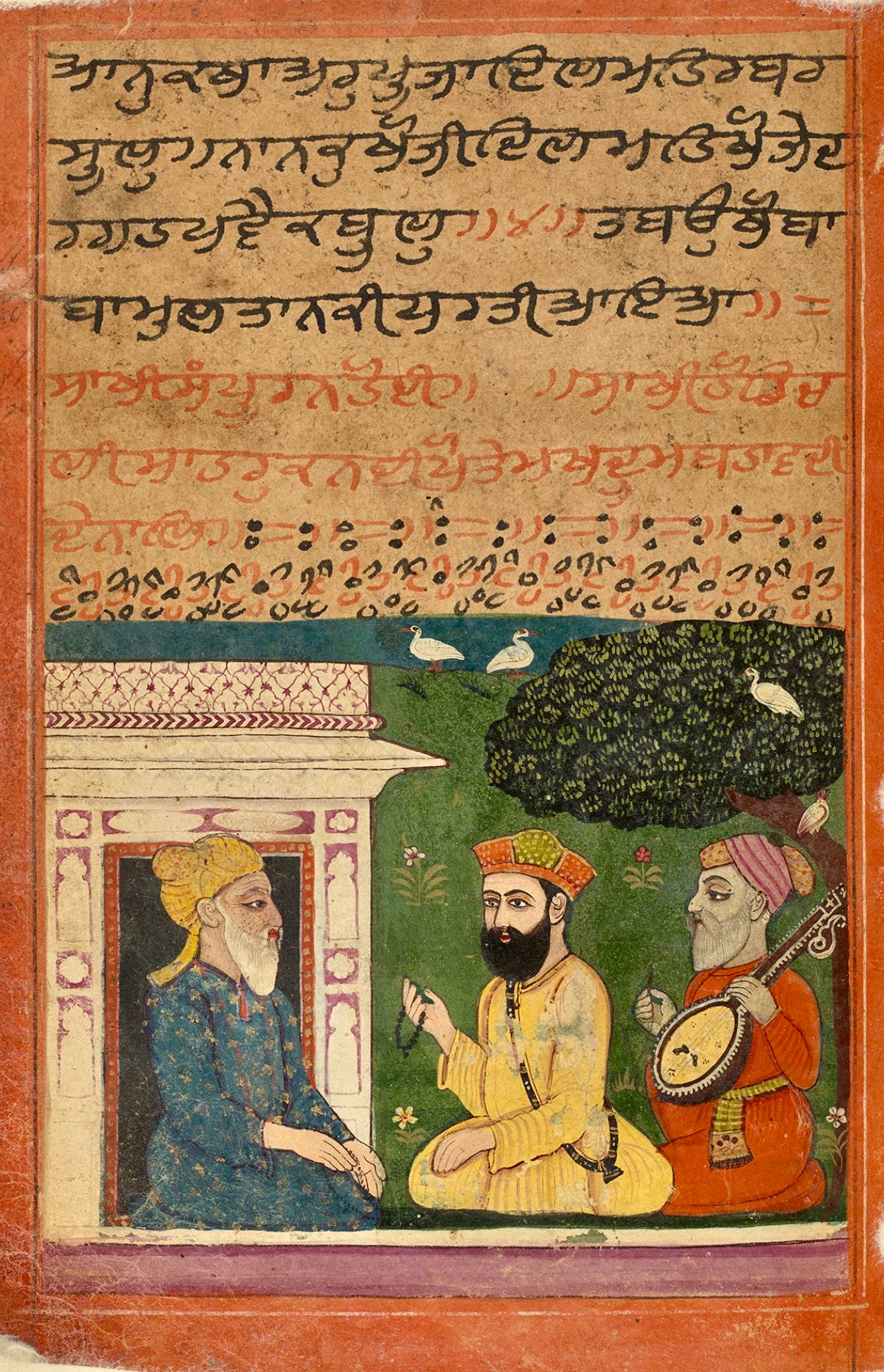

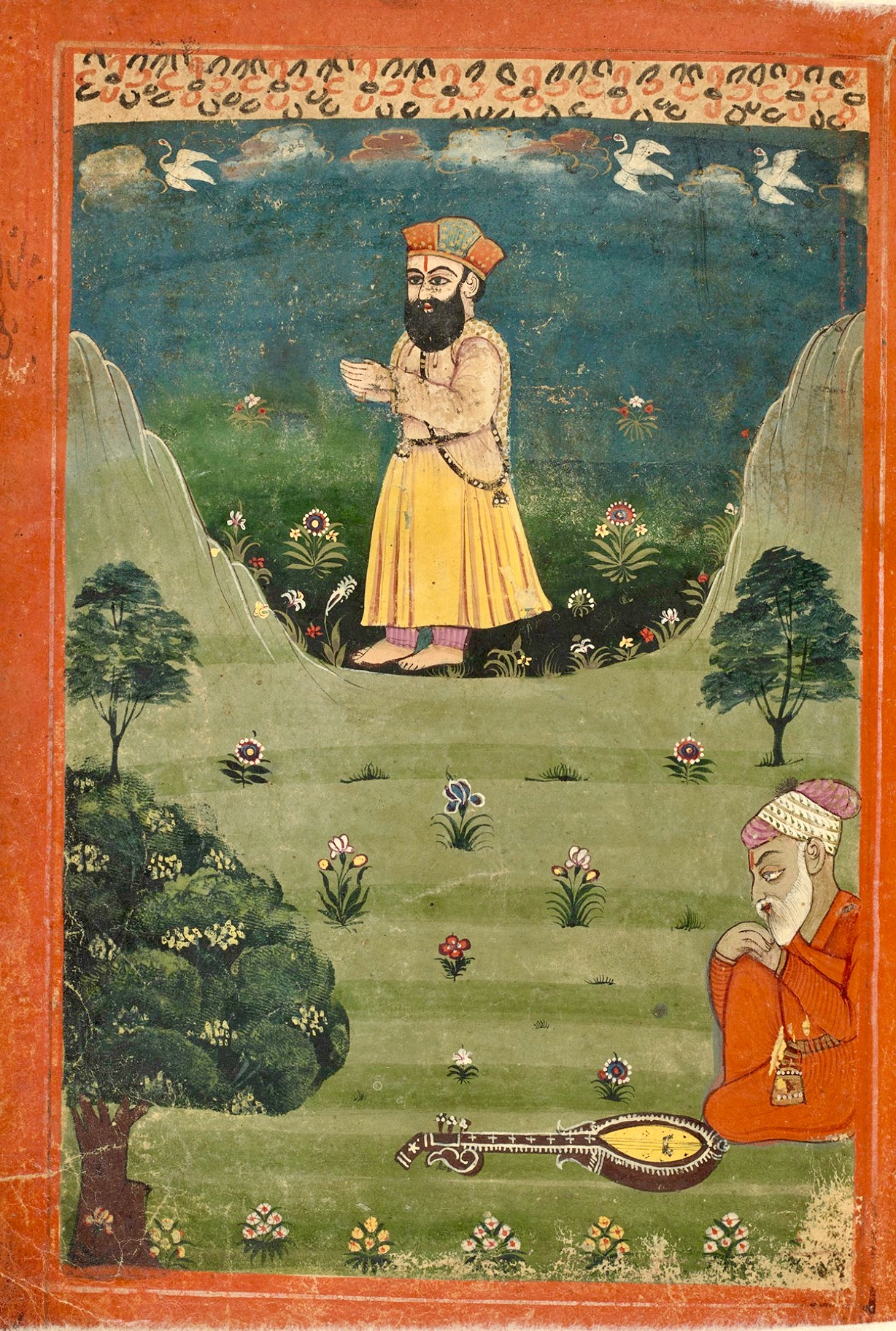

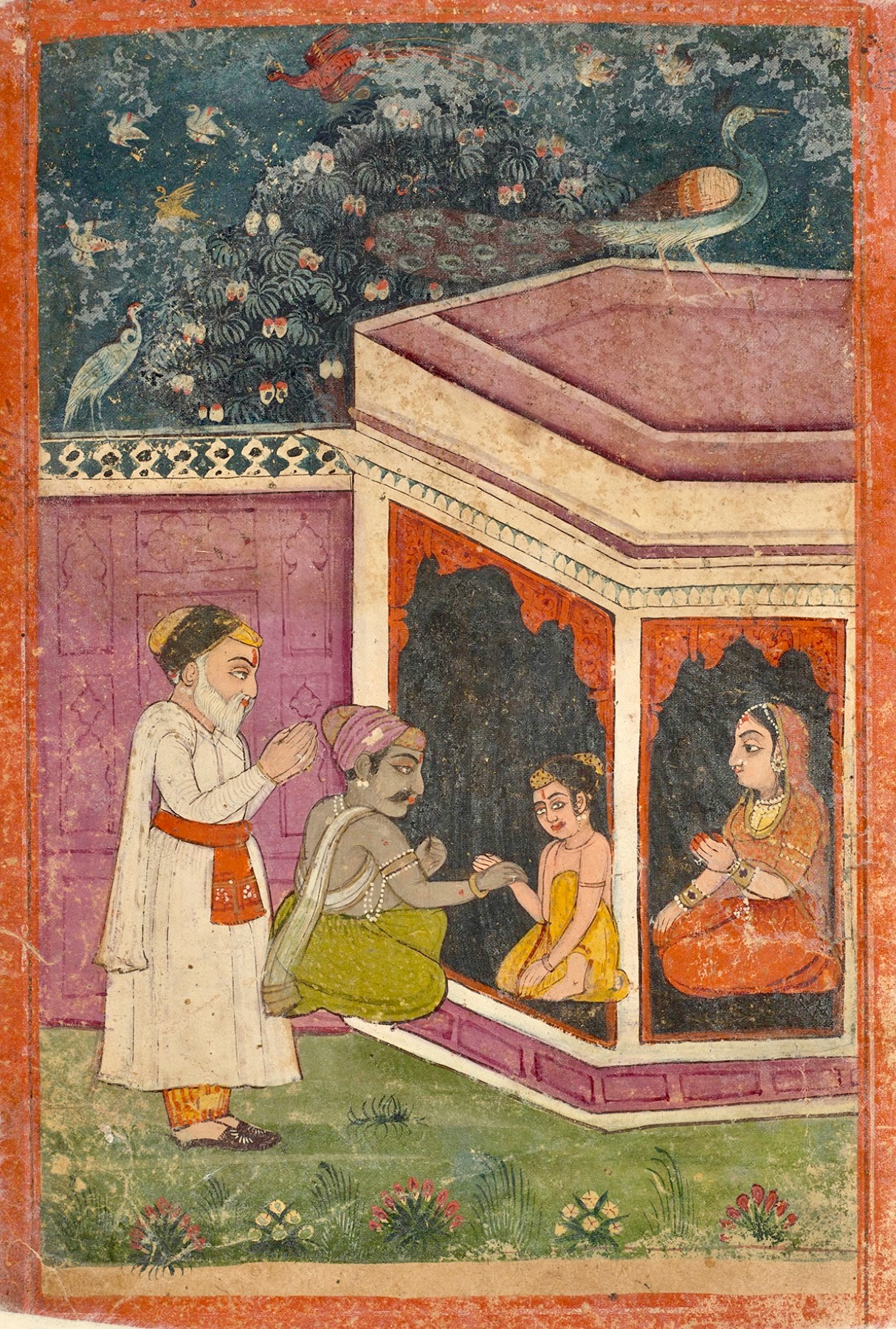

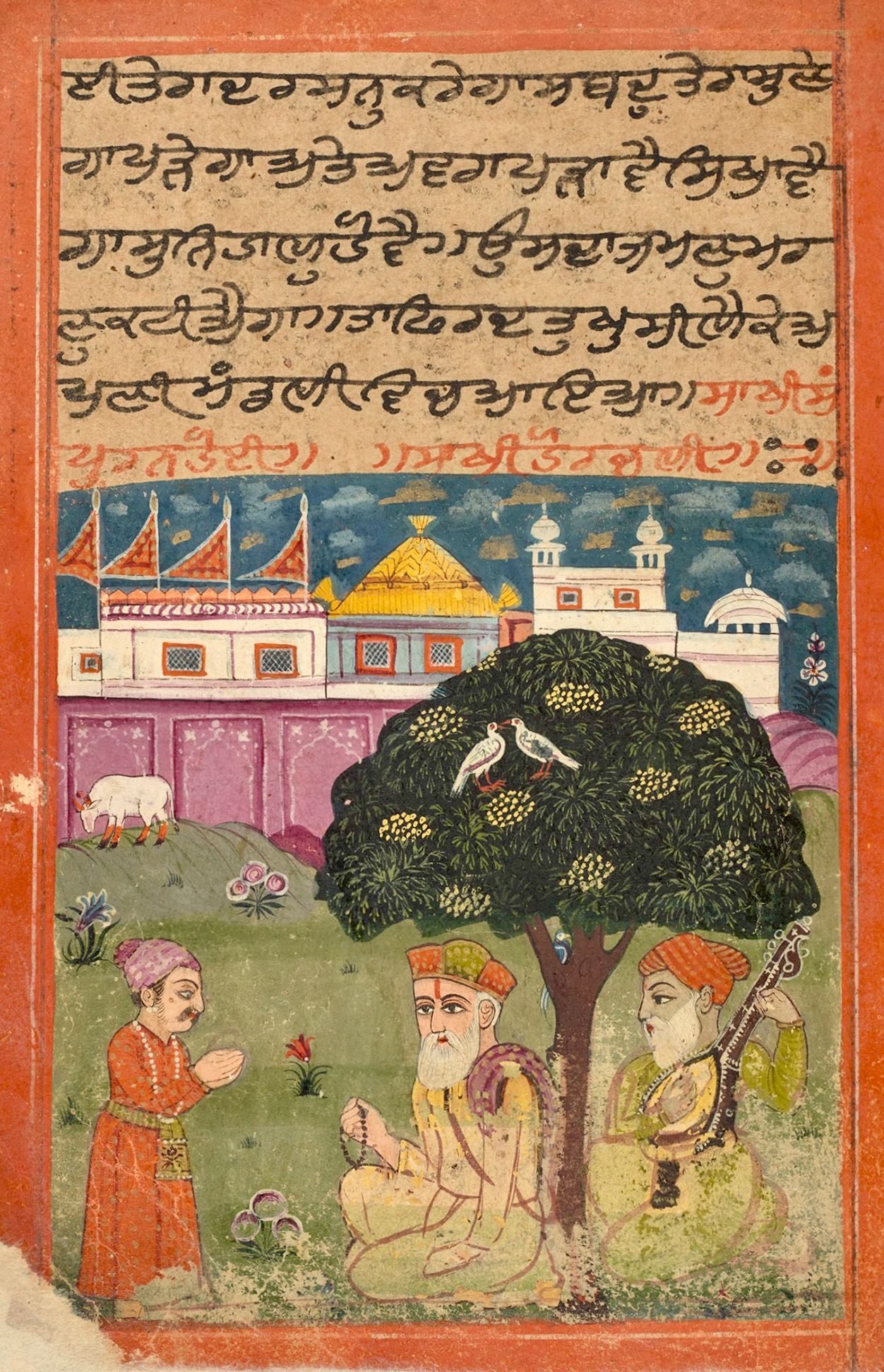

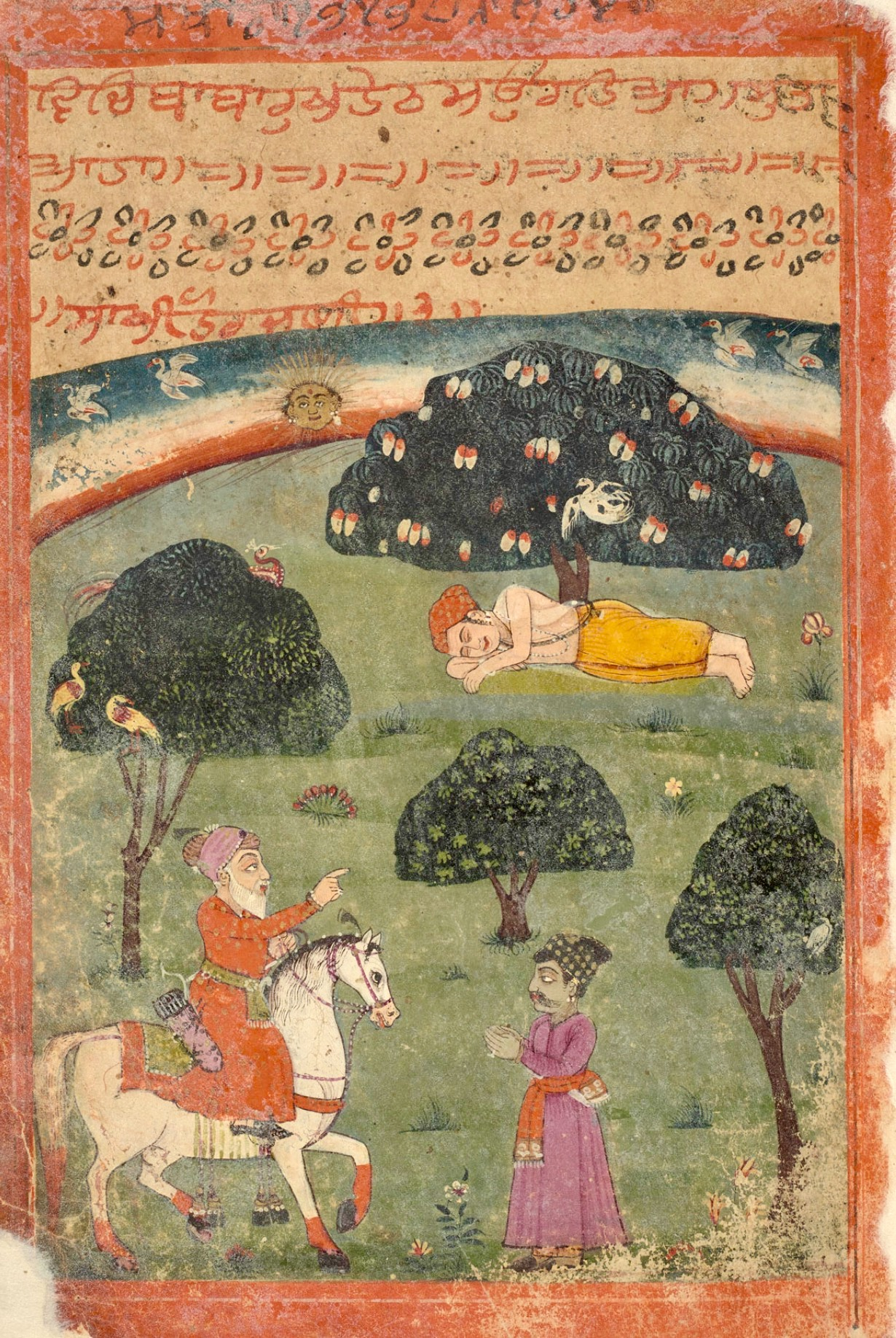

=== 19th century Janamsakhi ===
Janamsakhi manuscript paintings from the 19th century:

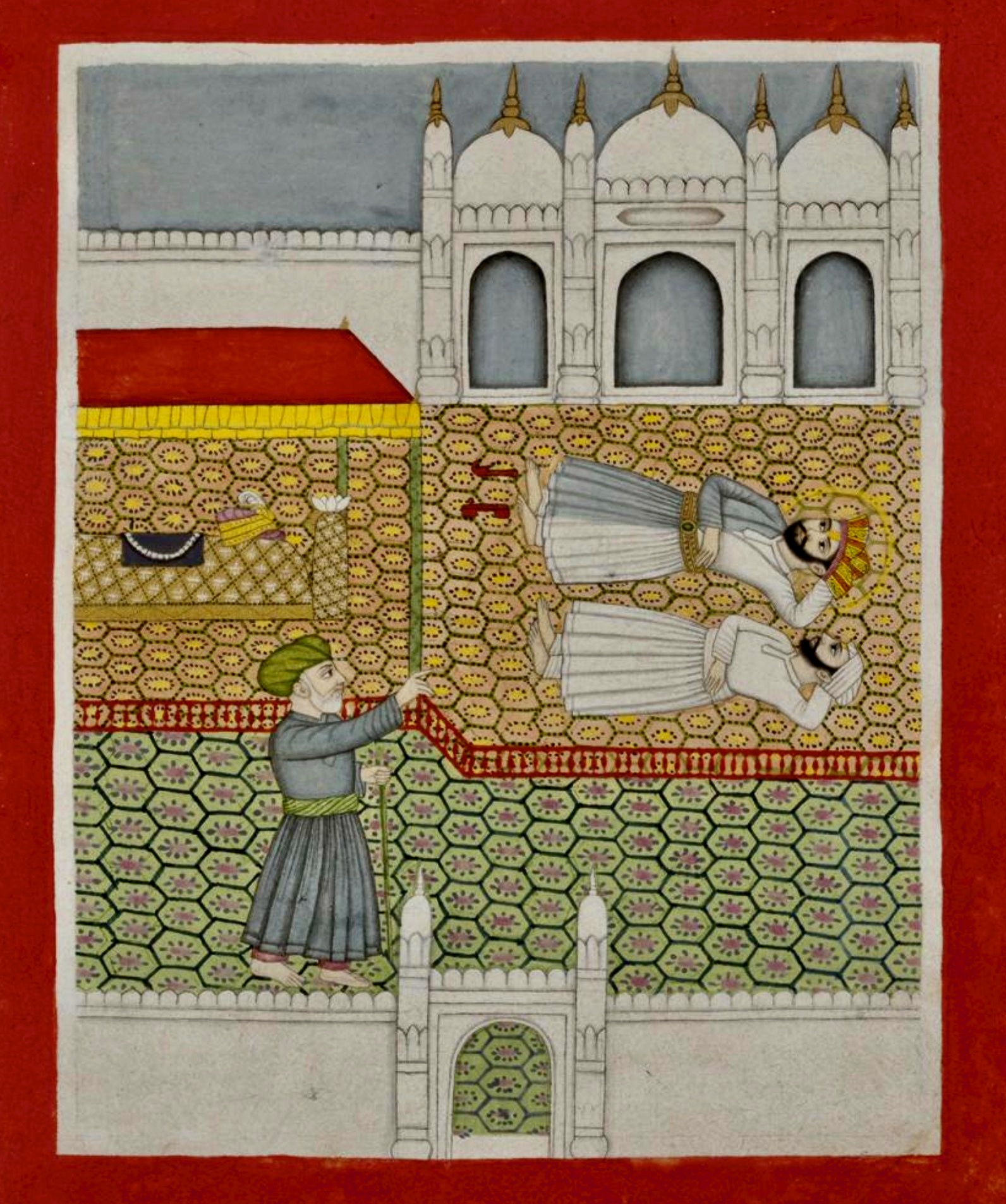

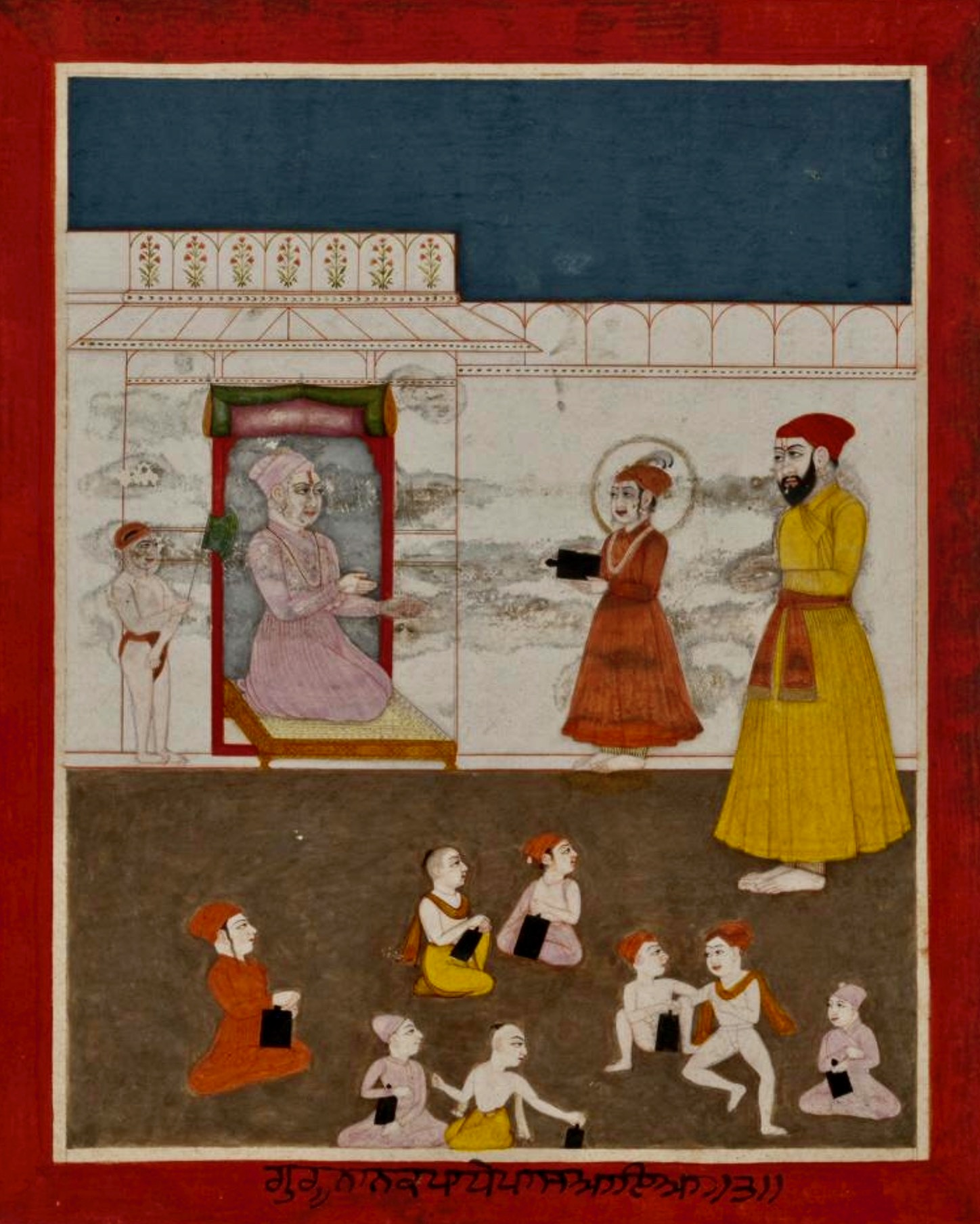

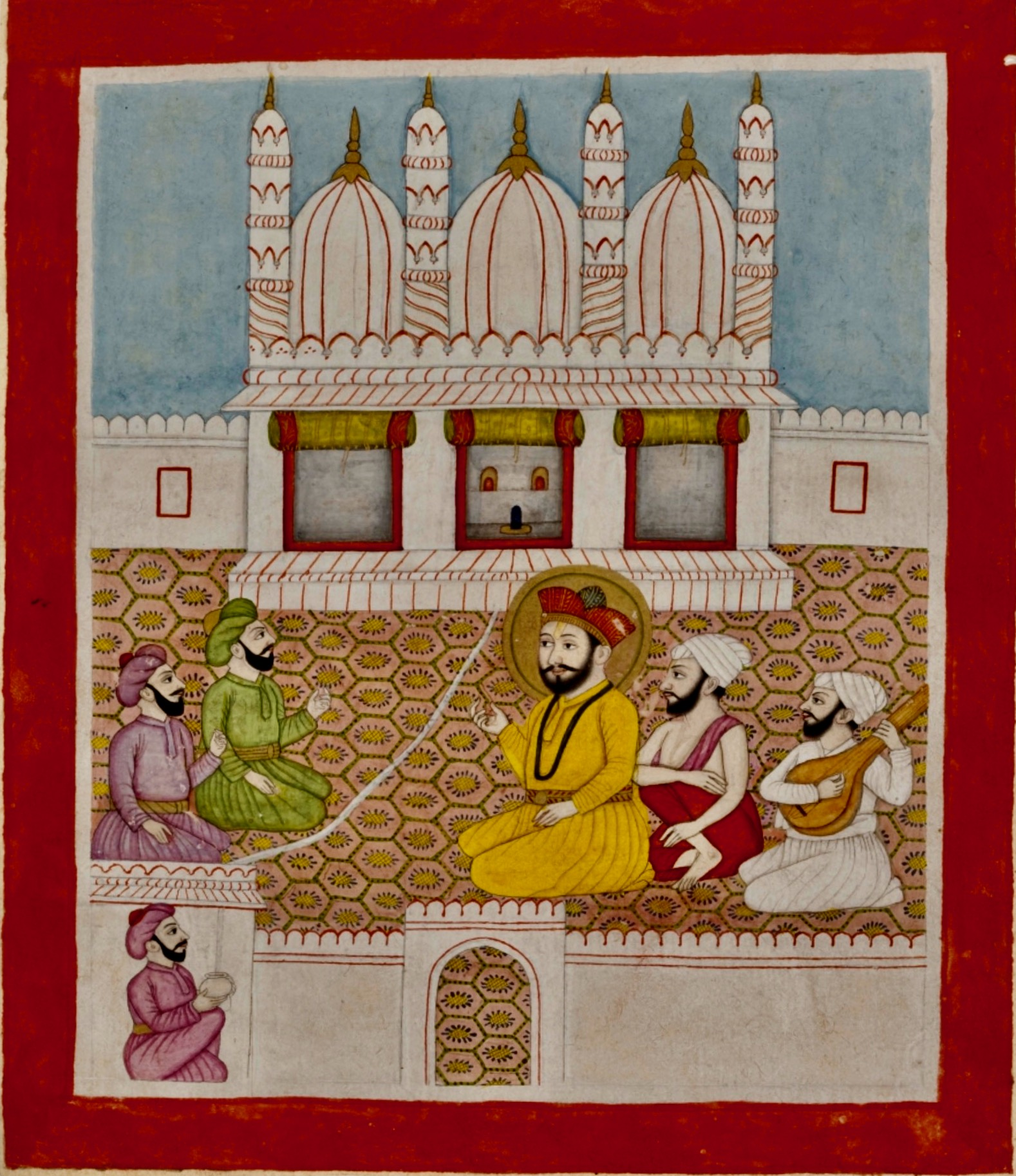

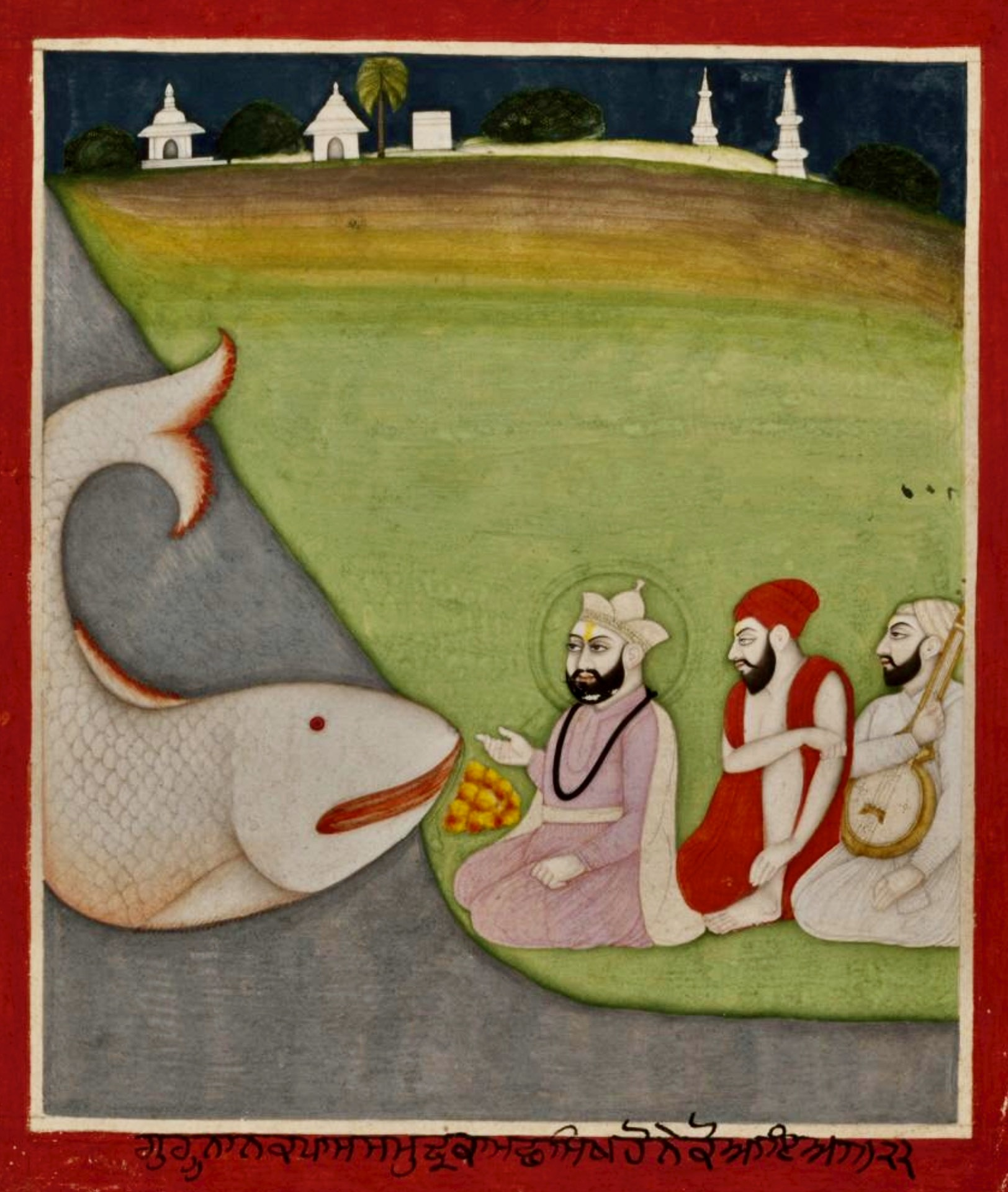

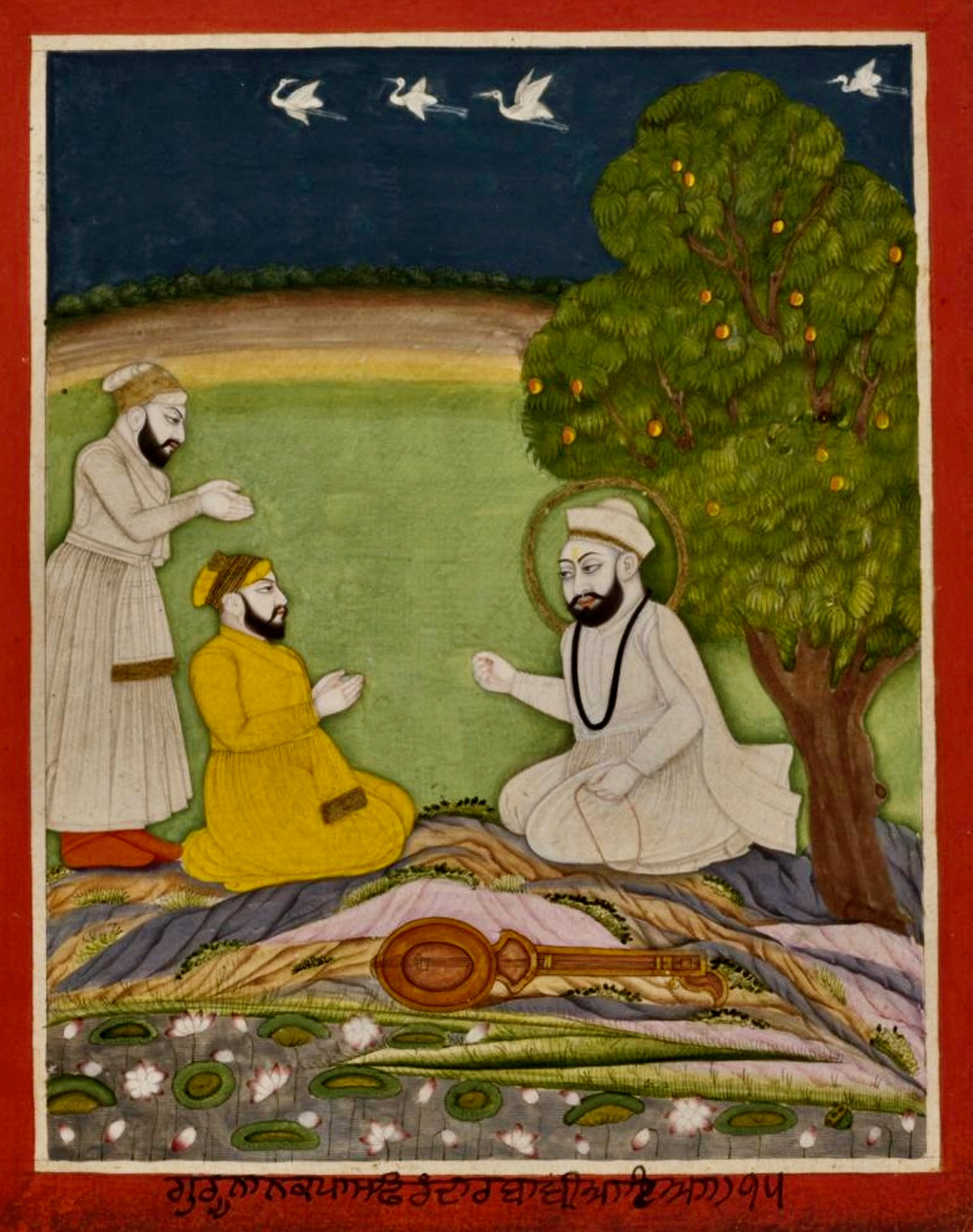

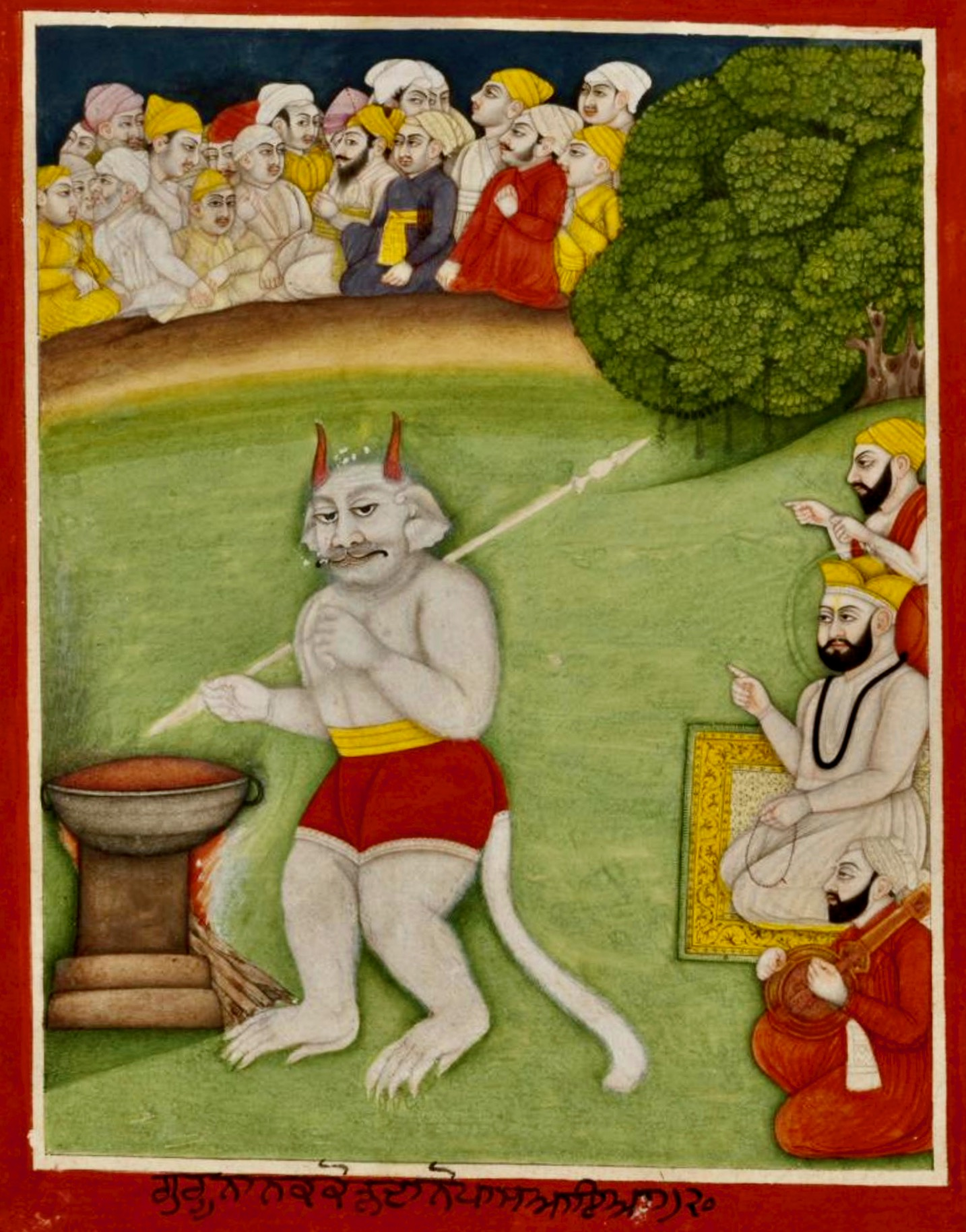

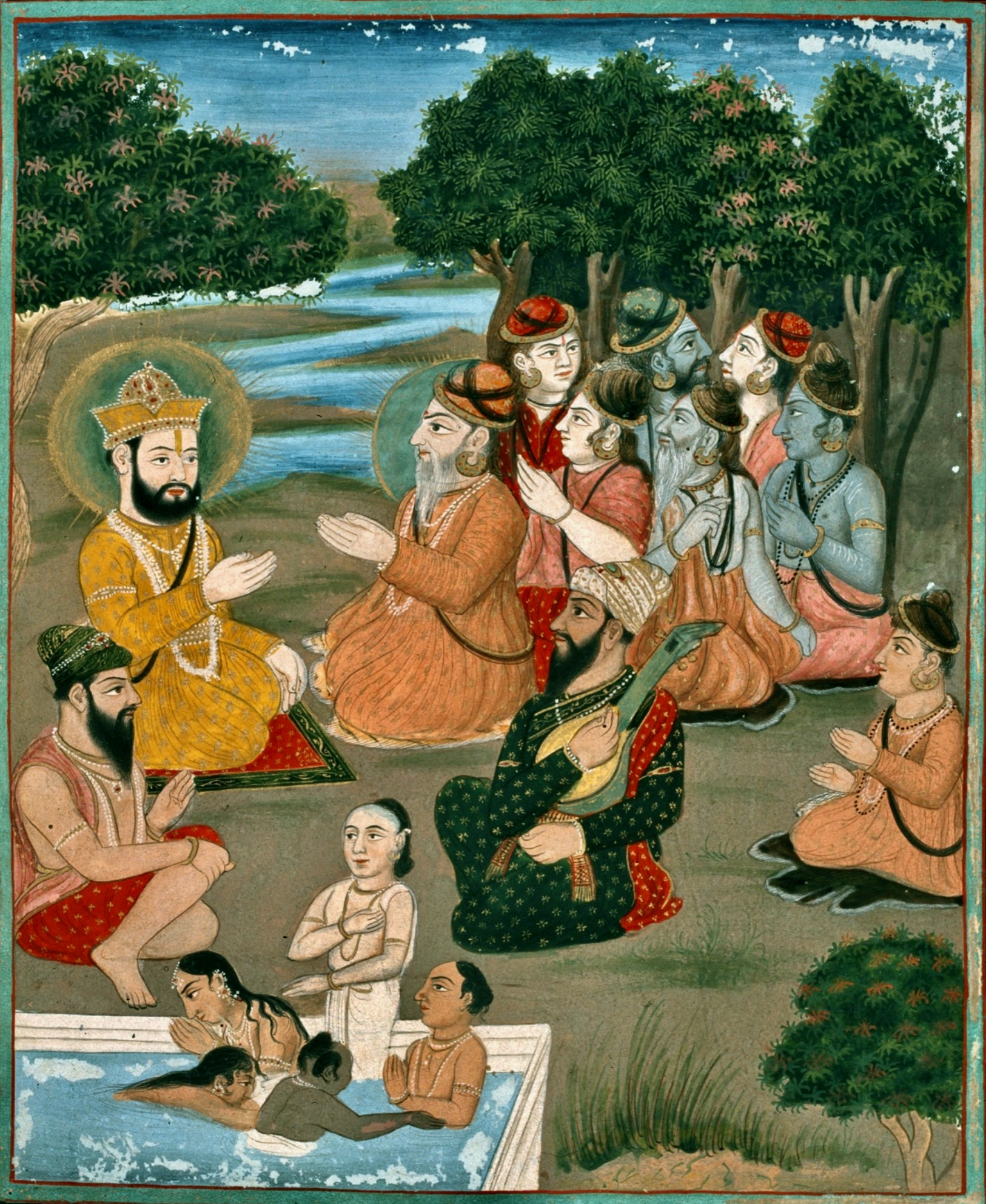

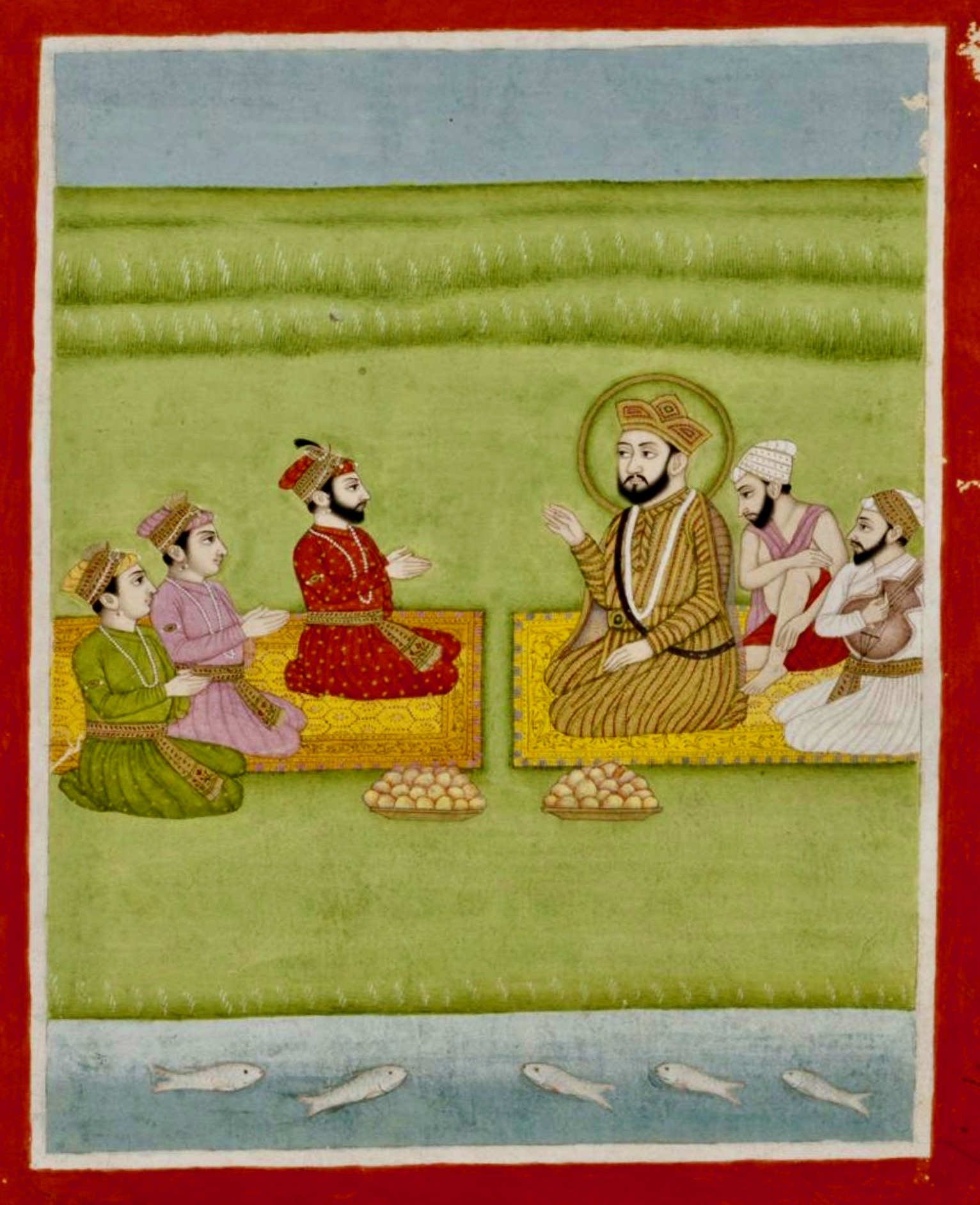

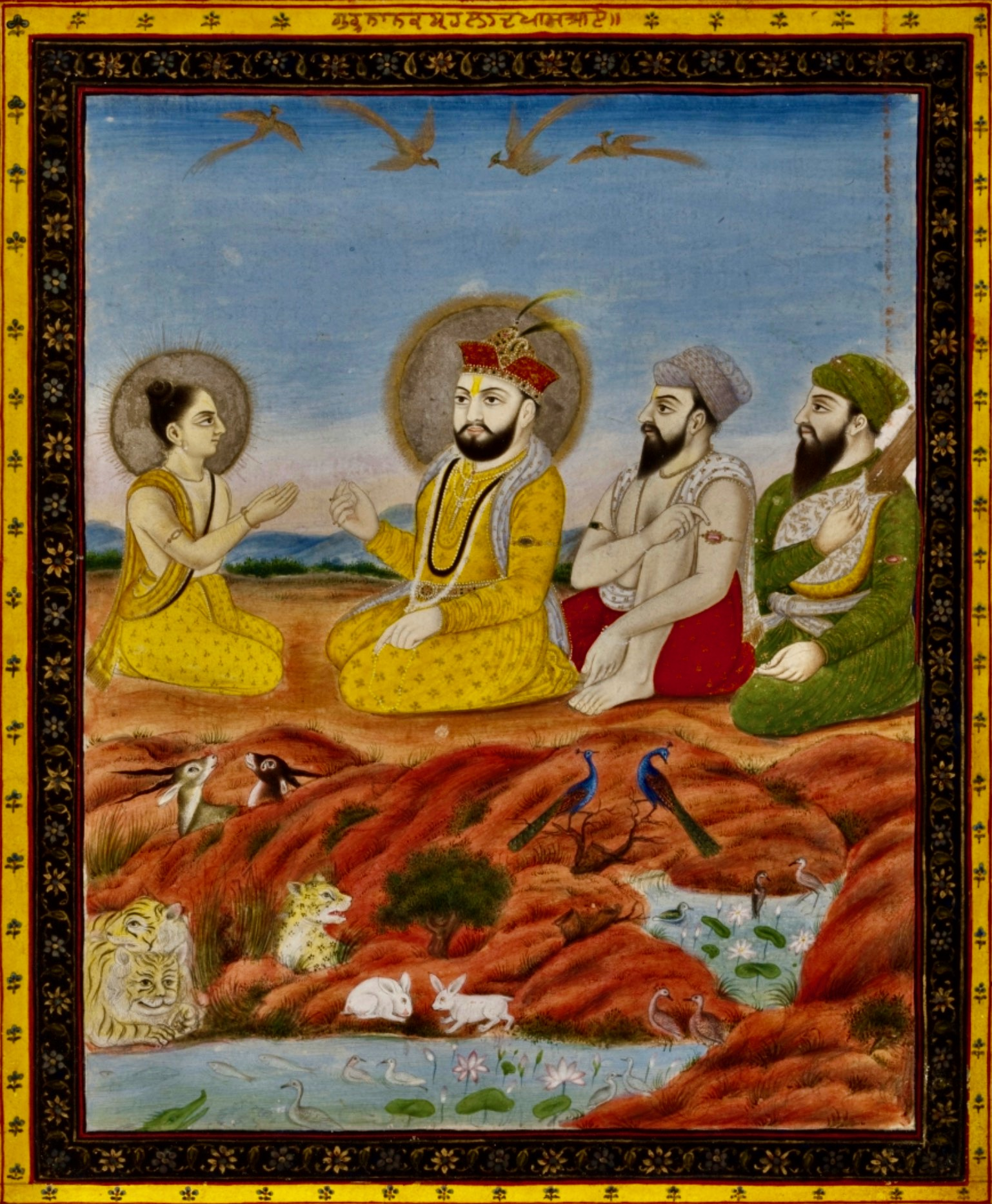

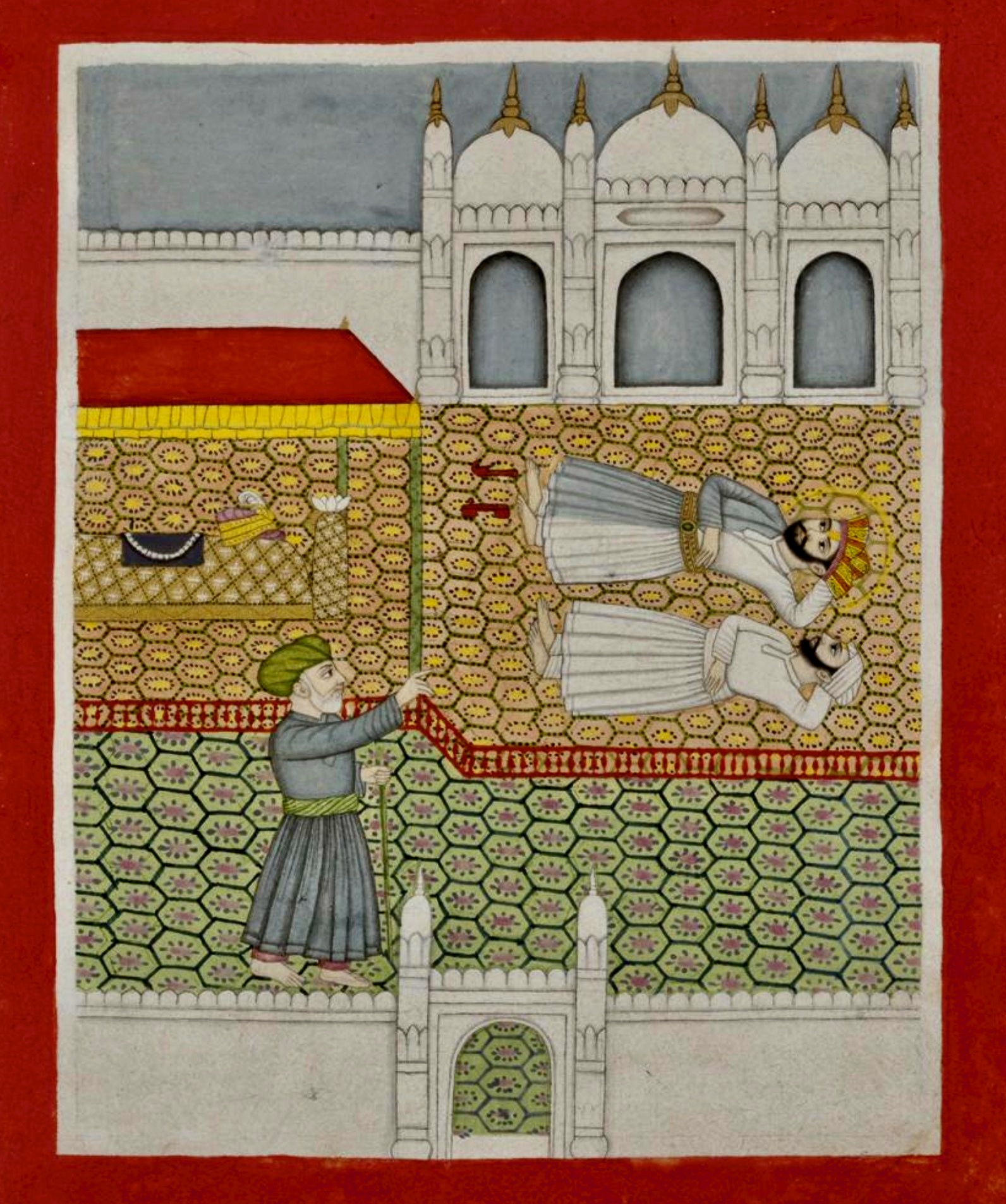

== See also ==
- Gurbilases
- Gurdwara Baba Atal, a historical gurdwara in Amritsar that contains fresco paintings depicting the events of Guru Nanak's life as relayed in the Janamsakhi literature
- Bhat Vahis
- Sakhi
