= Nanak Shah Fakir =

- Written by: Amrit Basra
- Produced by: Resul Pookutty
- Music by: Songs: Uttam Singh; Chouthi Poudi (White Sun); Background Score: Tuomas Kantelinen
- Distributed by: Viacom 18 Motion Pictures
- Release date: 17 April 2015
- Running time: 144 minutes
- Country: India
- Language: Punjabi

Nanak Shah Fakir is a 2015 Indian Punjabi-language biographical film based on the life of Guru Nanak, and produced by Gurbani Media Pvt. Ltd. It was theatrically released on 17 April 2015.

It won the awards for Best Feature Film on National Integration, Best Costume Design and Best Make-up Artist at the 63rd National Film Awards. Director Sartaj Singh Pannu

The film was mired in controversies with protests from Sikh groups asking for a ban on the film as it was claimed to depict Sikh figures through actors, which they said violated Sikh tenets.

== Cast ==
- Arif Zakaria as Bhai Mardana, narrator
- Puneet Sikka as Bebe Nanaki
- Adil Hussain as Rai Bular Bhatti
- Shraddha Kaul as Mata Tripta
- Anurag Arora as Kalu Mehta
- Tom Alter as Daulat Khan Lodi
- Manav Kaul as Jairam
- Narendra Jha as Malik Bhago

== Score ==
The original score was by Tuomas Kantelinen, with music by Uttam Singh and sound design by Resul Pookutty.

Nanak Shah Fakir (Original score Mentor) – A. R. Rahman
No.	Title	Lyrics	Singer(s)	Length
1.	"Sat Guru Nanak"	Bhai Gurdasji	Pt. Jasraj
2.	"Daya Kapah"	Guru Nanak Dev ji	Puneet Sikka
3.	"Hak Paraya"	Guru Nanak Dev ji	Bhai Nirmal Singh
4.	"Maas Maas"	Guru Nanak Dev ji	Bhai Nirmal Singh
5.	"Gagan Mein Thaal"	Guru Nanak Dev ji	Bhai Nirmal Singh
6.	"Allah Alakh"	Guru Nanak Dev ji	Bhai Nirmal Singh
7.	"Jaise Mai Aavai"	Guru Nanak Dev ji	Bhai Nirmal Singh
8.	"Khurasan"	Guru Nanak Dev ji	Bhai Nirmal Singh
9.	"Nanak Aaya"	Bhai Gurdasji	Pt.Jasraj
10.	"Nanak Aaya"	Bhai Gurdasji	Sonu Nigam, Kailash Kher, Roop Kumar Rathod, Uttam Singh, Pt.Jasraj, Jiya Wadekar, Tej Boodardekar, Puneet Sikka
11.	"Waheguru"	Bhai Gurdasji	Chours
12.	"Waheguru"	Bhai Gurdasji	Chours
Total length:				44:15

== Controversy ==
The supreme Sikh body, Akal Takht announced a ban on the film, as it was claimed to depict Guru Nanak and other prominent Sikh figures (Bebe Nanaki, Bhai Mardana) through human actors, which it said violated Sikh tenets. A related resolution adopted by the SGPC in 2003 had prohibited human actors from playing the roles of Sikh Gurus or their family members.

The Government of Punjab decided against allowing the release of the film. The film producers Resul Pookutty and Gurbani Media also appealed to the Supreme Court of India to allow for the release of the film. The Supreme court cleared the film for release, citing the certification provided by India's Central Board for Film Certification.

== Awards ==
- Best Costume Design – Payal Saluja
- Best Make-up Artist – Preetisheel Singh D'Souza and Clover Wootton
