= Guru Nanak (disambiguation) =

Guru Nanak (1469 – 1539) was the founder of Sikhism, and the first of the ten Sikh gurus.

Guru Nanak may refer to:

- Guru Nanak Darbar Gurdwara, in Gravesend, UK
- Guru Nanak Khalsa College of Arts, Science & Commerce, India
- Guru Nanak Gurdwara Smethwick, in Smethwick, UK
- Guru Nanak Jhira Sahib, a Sikh historical shrine situated in Bidar, Karnataka, 1948
- Guru Nanak Stadium, a football stadium in Ludhiana, India
- Guru Nanak Gurpurab, also known as Guru Nanak's Prakash Utsav and Guru Nanak Jayanti, which celebrates the birth of the first Sikh Guru
- Baba Guru Nanak University, an planned university in Nankana Sahib, Punjab, Pakistan

== See also ==
- Guru Nanak Dev (disambiguation)
- Guru Nanak College (disambiguation)
- Nanak Shah Fakir, 2015 Indian film about the Sikh guru
