= Gurdwara Janamasthan =

Gurdwara Janamasthan may refer to:

- Gurdwara Janam Asthan, located in Nankana Sahib, Pakistan
- Gurdwara Janam Asthan Guru Ram Das, located in Lahore city
- Gurdwara Janam Asthan Bebe Nanaki, located in Dera Chahal, Lahore district
