= Rai Bhoe Bhatti =

- Born: 1380; Talwandi, Punjab
- Died: 1454/1461; Delhi Sultanate
- Occupation: Zamindar of Delhi Sultanate
- Known for: Rebuilding Talwandi after its destruction
- Father: Raaney Bhatti

Rai Bhoe Bhatti (Note: Punjabi: راۓ بھوۓ بھٹی) (c. 1380–1454 or 1461), alternatively spelt as Bhoi, was a Muslim Rajput zamindar of the Punjab region under the Delhi Sultanate. He is best known for establishing the rebuilt Nankana Sahib, formerly known as Rai-Bhoi-di-Talwandi, a village in the province of Punjab (an 'Iqta in the Delhi Sultanate), where Guru Nanak, the founder of Sikhism, was born. He was born a Hindu but embraced Islam later on in his life. (Note: Other sources state he was born a Muslim and it was an earlier ancestor who made the conversion from Hinduism to Islam.) He was the son of Rai Raaney Bhatti.

== Biography ==
Ancestors of Bhatti tribe arrived in Punjab in the early 14th century during the reign of Alauddin Khalji (1295–1315). Khalji army had attacked Jaisalmer, a state in Rajputana (now Rajasthan in India), to avenge raids by Hindu Rajputs. After a bloody battle, one of the Bhatti Rajput prince along with his clansmen who survived were taken hostage. They were converted to Islam and sent to exile in northern Punjab, near Kotli (about 40 miles from the present-day Lahore). According to the legend, Alauddin was so touched by their bravery that he paid a tribute to them by giving them about 1,50,000 acres of Punjab's most fertile land as compensation for their defeat and also as an enticement to keep them from rallying troops and building a new Rajput Bhatti Army. According to some sources, his ancestor, Rai Addel Bhatti (1265–1350) was the one who made the first conversion from Hinduism to Islam in the family due to the influence of Sufism.

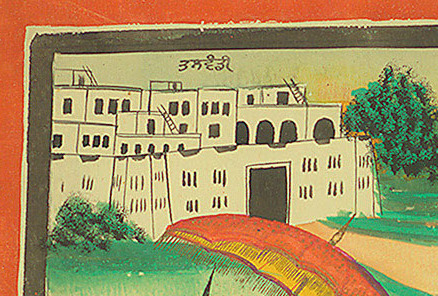
The village of Rai-Bhoi-Di-Talwandi, detail of a painting by Gian Singh Naqqash

Bhoe Bhatti supervised the rebuilding of the village of Talwandi after it had been destroyed during the numerous invasions of the Punjab (and the wider subcontinent) by invaders such as Timur. During his tenure-ship as the village's feudal lord or zamindar, the village successfully grew in population through developments supervised by Rai Bhoe and also the assured security from foreign invasions.

Bhatti had a son named Rai Bular Bhatti, born in circa 1425 (according to records kept by bards) or 1430, who would succeed him as the local zamindar. Bular Bhatti would later gain recognition for being the employer of Mehta Kalu, the father of Guru Nanak, the founder of Sikhism.
