= Guru Nanak Dev Engineering College =

Guru Nanak Dev Engineering College may refer to:

- Guru Nanak Dev Engineering College, Ludhiana, in Punjab, India
- Guru Nanak Dev Engineering College, Bidar, in Karnataka, India

== See also ==
- Guru Nanak Dev (disambiguation)
