= Guru Nanak College =

- Guru Nanak College, Chennai, a college in Velachery, Chennai, India
  - Guru Nanak College Ground, a cricket ground in Velachery, Chennai
- Guru Nanak College of Arts, Science and Commerce, GTB Nagar, Mumbai, India
- Guru Nanak Khalsa College of Arts, Science & Commerce, Mumbai, India

== See also ==
- Guru Nanak (disambiguation)
