= Bhai Bala =

Companion of Nanak (1466–1544)

- ਭਾਈ ਬਾਲਾ
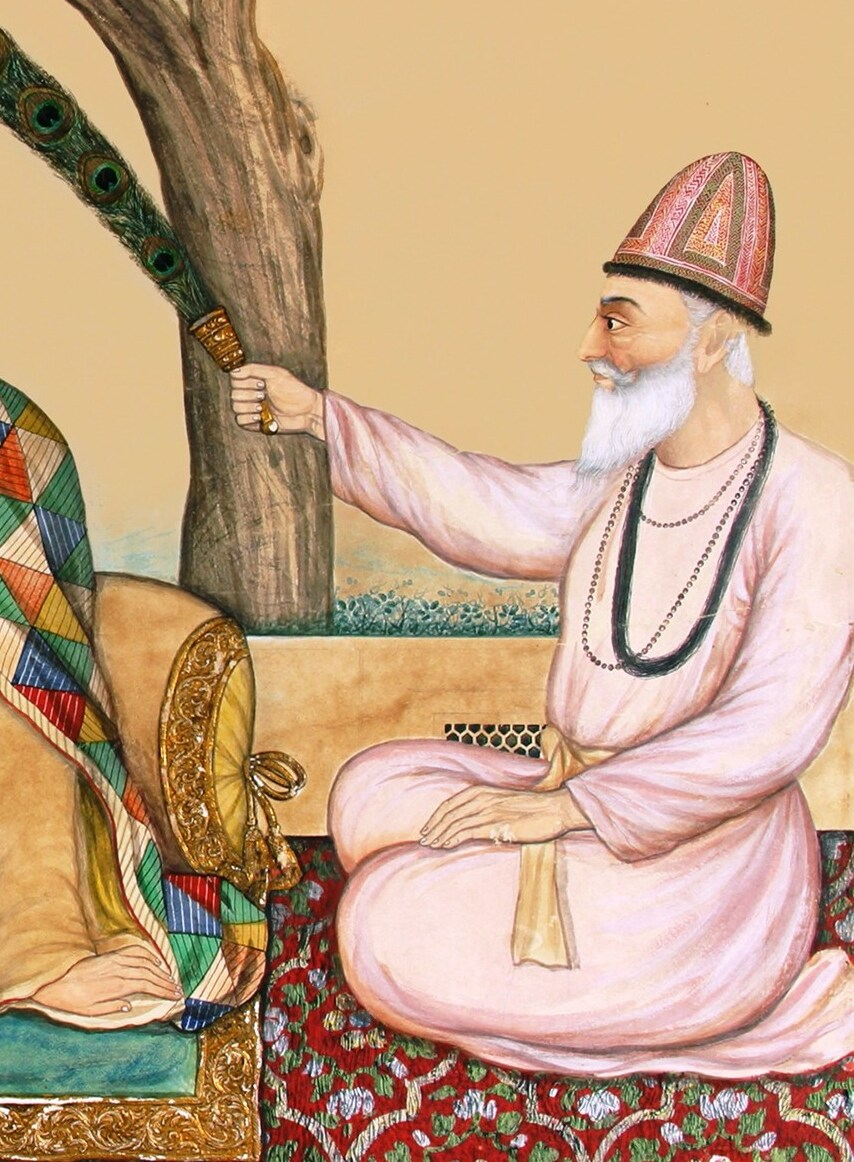
- Bhai Bala seated to the right of Nanak

Personal life
- Born: Bala Sandhu; 1466 Rai-Bhoi-Di-Talwandi, Punjab
- Died: 1544 (aged 77–78) Khadur Sahib
- Cremation place: Precincts of the modern Gurdwara Tapiana Sahib
- Parent: Chandar Bhan Sandhu (father)

Religious life
- Religion: Hinduism (birth); Sikhism (convert)

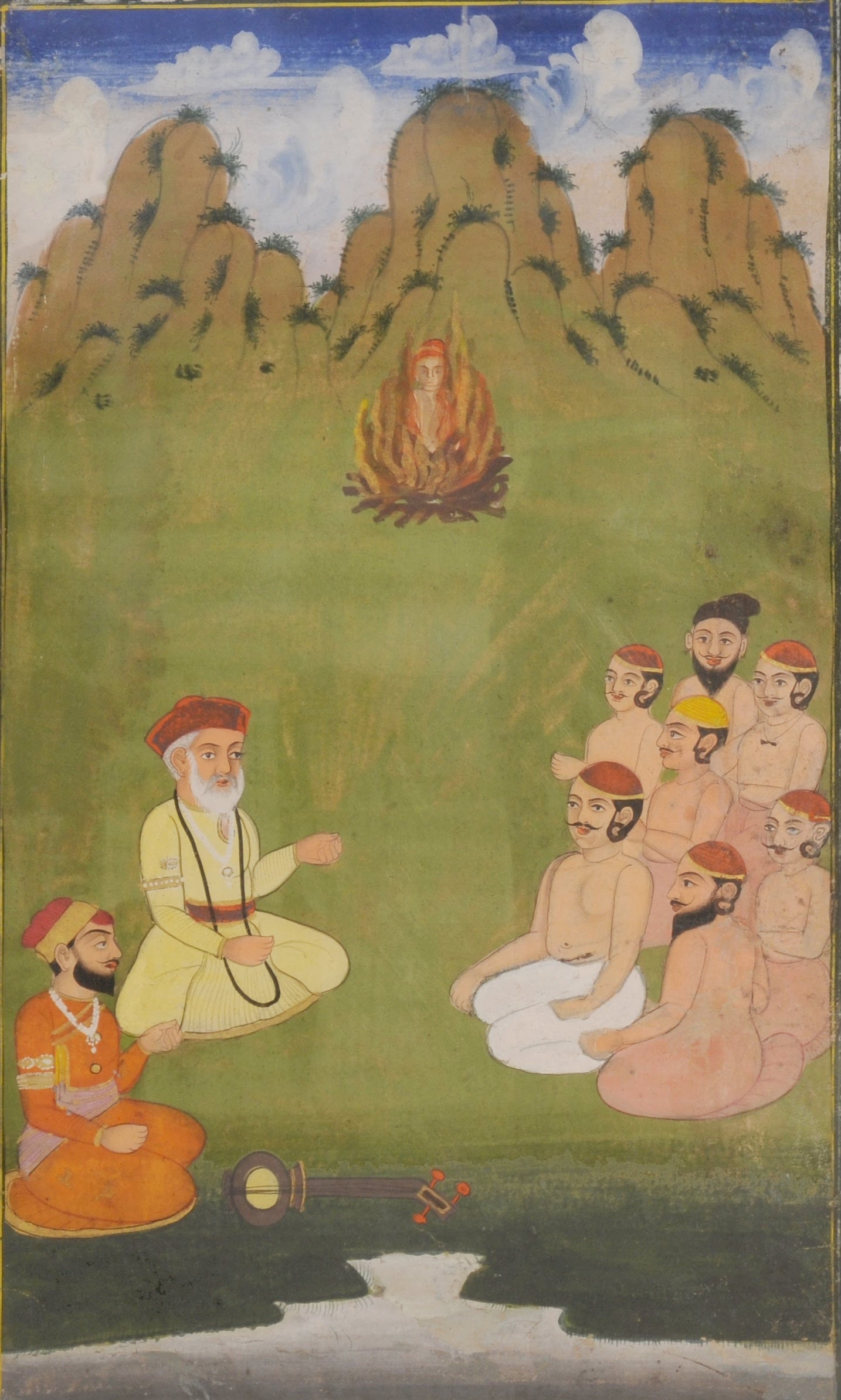
Cremation of Bhai Bala, ca.1825–1849 painting

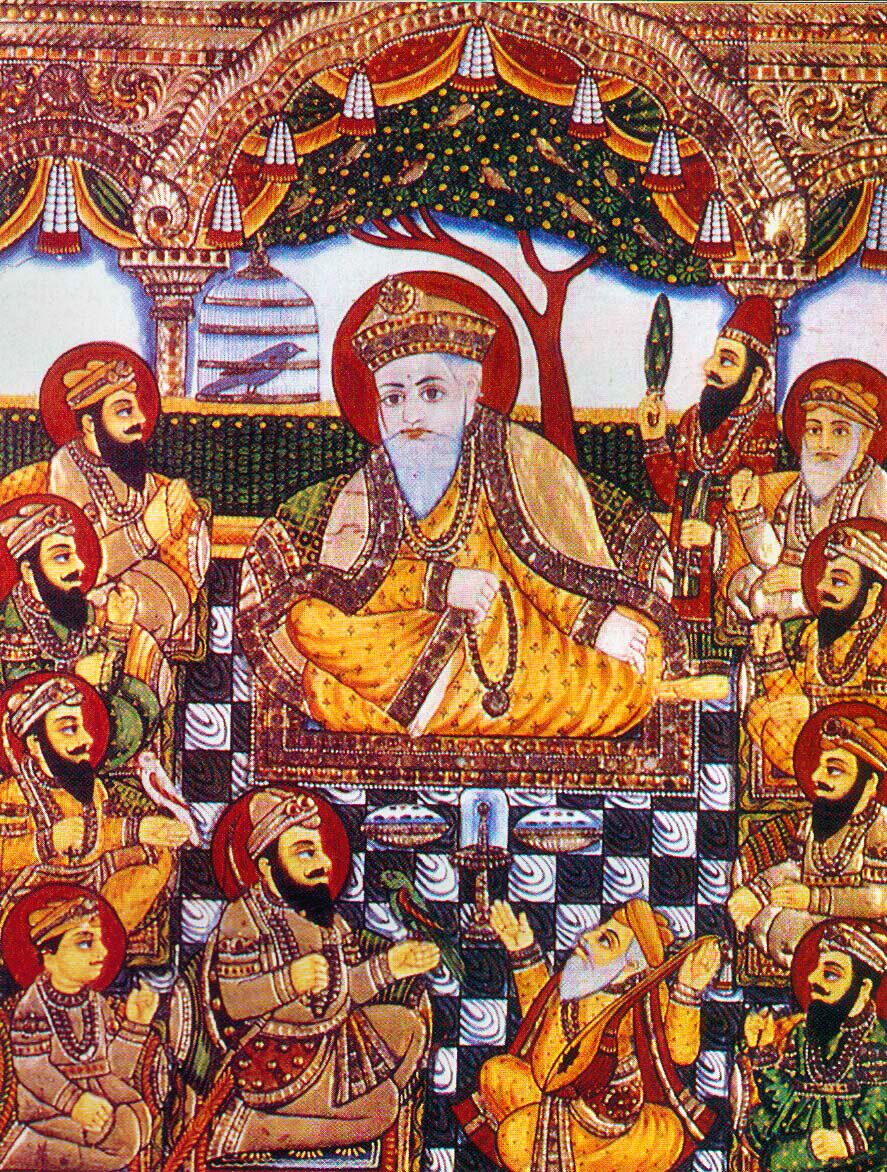
A rare Tanjore style painting from the late 19th century depicting the ten Sikh Gurus with Bhai Bala and Bhai Mardana.

Bhai Bala (Punjabi: ਭਾਈ ਬਾਲਾ, romanized: Bhāī Bālā; 1466–1544) is believed by some to have been a companion of Guru Nanak. Born in Talwandi into a Sandhu Jat family, Bala is also said to have been a close associate of Bhai Mardana.

== Biography ==
According to the Bhai Bala janamsakhis, he traveled with Guru Nanak and Bhai Mardana on all of their great journeys around the world including China, Mecca, and around India. He supposedly died in Khadur Sahib, in his late 70s, in 1544.

== Historicity ==
There has been considerable discussion as regards Bhai Bala's existence, particularly within the Sikh academic field. Bhai Gurdas, who has listed all Guru Nanak's prominent disciples (in his 11th Var), does not mention the name of Bhai Bala (this may be an oversight, for he does not mention Rai Bular either). However Bhai Mani Singh's Bhagat Ratanwali, which contains essentially the same list as that by Bhai Gurdas, but with more detail, also does not mention Bhai Bala. There are a number of other anomalies, which Dr. Kirpal Singh has explicated in his Punjabi work janamsakhi tradition.

Trilochan Singh counters some of the points raised by stating that Mehma Parkash Kavita and Mani Singh janamsakhi both mention Bhai Bala, though McLeod notes that the earlier versions of Mani Singh’s text make no mention, Bala is further mentioned in Suchak Prasang Guru Ka by Bhai Behlo written during Guru Arjan Dev’s time. Bhai Behlo says, “Bala discarded his body there, At the holy city of Khadaur, Angad, the master, performed the rites, Graciously with his own two hands.” He also raises the point that Bhai Bala’s family is still living in Nankana Sahib and that Bala’s samadhi exists in Khadaur. W.H. McLeod counters some of the points noting that no copy of Bhai Behlo’s writing exists until the 1800s and is deemed to be a forgery by a majority of scholars and it uses modern Punjabi language. According to H.S. Singha, some scholars argue that Bhai Bala was a genuine person, however his janamsakhi hagiographies had been corrupted by heretical sects such as the Minas, Handaliyas, and others. The earliest extant Bala version rendition of the janamsakhis itself claims to date to 1525 but this has been rejected by New Zealand historian W.H. McLeod.
