= Gurdwara Janamasthan Bebe Nanaki =

Sikh temple in Dera Chahal, Pakistan

Religion
- Affiliation: Sikhism
- Status: Operational

Location
- Location: Dera Chahal, Lahore district, Punjab, Pakistan

Gurdwara Janamasthan Bebe Nanaki, also known as Gurdwara Dera Chahal Patshahi Pehli, is a Sikh gurdwara located within the middle of the settlement of Dera Chahal in Lahore district, Punjab, Pakistan.The gurdwara is still functioning as a Sikh place of worship. The site is located in the village that the mother and in-laws of Guru Nanak lived. Bebe Nanaki, the elder sister of Guru Nanak, was born here. Guru Nanak stayed here for a bit during his wedding. Prior to partition, the gurdwara had 100 acres associated with it. Sikh pilgrimage to the gurdwara was restored by the Pakistani government in 2012. The gurdwara is located at the coordinates 31°26'37.6"N 74°28'19.5"E.
