= Guru Nanak Dev (disambiguation) =

Guru Nanak Dev was the founder of the religion of Sikhism and the first of the ten Sikh Gurus.

Guru Nanak Dev may also refer to:

- Guru Nanak Dev University, a university in Amritsar, Punjab, India
- Guru Nanak Dev Engineering College (disambiguation)
- Baba Guru Nanak University, Nankana Sahib, Pakistan
