= Rai Bular Bhatti =

Muslim noble

Rai Bular
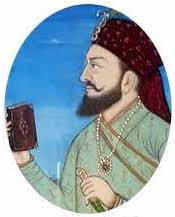
- Posthumous depiction
- Born: Rai Bular Bhatti c. 1425 (according to records kept by bards) or 1430
- Died: c. 1515 or 1518
- Occupations: Zamindar of Rai-Bhoi-Di-Talwandi, now Nankana Sahib
- Employer: Daulat Khan
- Known for: involvement in life of Guru Nanak
- Father: Rai Bhoe

Rai Bular Bhatti (Note: Punjabi: راۓ بلار بھٹی) (died c. 1515 or 1518) was a Muslim Rajput feudal lord of the Bhatti clan during the latter half of the 15th century.

== Biography ==
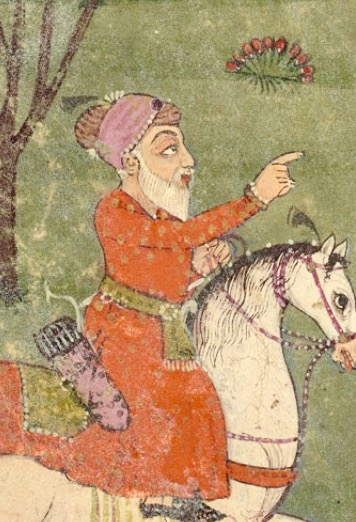
Rai Bular Bhatti—1733 CE Janamsakhi British Library MS Panj B 40, Guru Nanak hagiography 6, Bhai Sangu Mal

He inherited the position as zamindar of Talwandi from his father Rai Bhoi.

Although a Muslim by faith, Rai was inspired by Guru Nanak, the founder of Sikhism and donated half of his land—over 18,500 acres of agricultural land.

Mehta Kalu, the father of Guru Nanak, was an employee of Bhatti. He was among the first few people who viewed Nanak as someone who was specially gifted by God. The land he donated is now under the control of Evacuee Trust Property Board of Pakistan.

Bular's descendants, the Rai family of Bhattis, have continued to play an active role in the area through to the 21st century.

A portrait of Rai Bular was installed in the Central Sikh Museum of the Golden Temple complex under the supervision of the SGPC on 15 October 2022 to commemorate his important place in Sikhism. His descendants from Pakistan whom were invited to attend the event were unable to due to visa clearance issues.

== Gallery ==
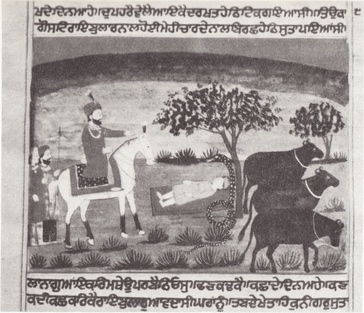
Janamsakhi manuscript painting with the caption 'Rai Bular witnesses cobra providing shade to young Guru Nanak on hot sunny day'

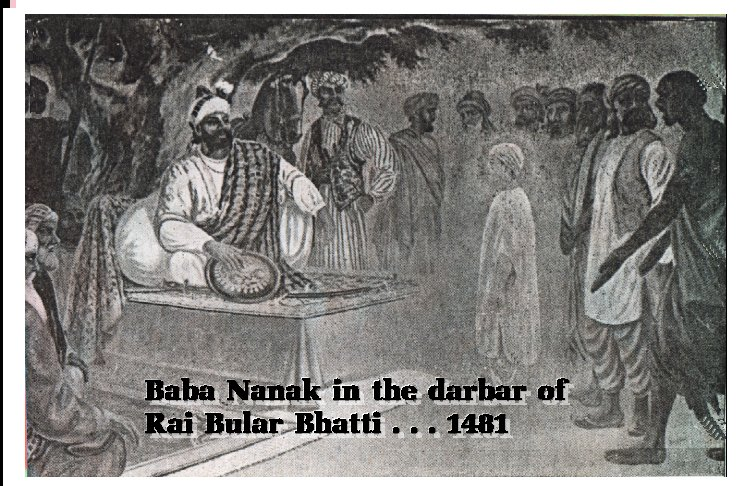
Nanak in the darbar of Rai Bular in 1481

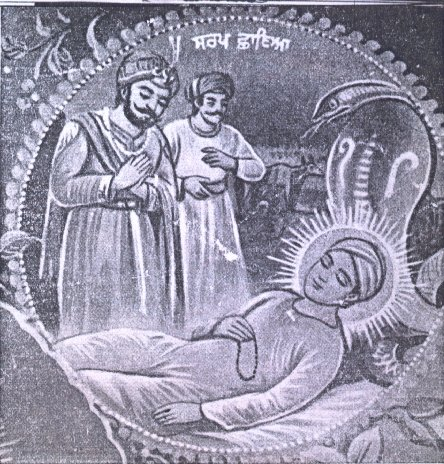
Depiction of Rai Bular witnessing the sakhi involving Guru Nanak and the cobra
