= Hakim Pur, Doaba Region =

Hakim Pur
- Village
- Location in Punjab, India Hakim Pur (India)
- Coordinates: 31.118101°N 75.925547°E
- Country: India
- State: Punjab

Population
  - Total: 2,000 Approx

Languages
  - Official: Punjabi
- Time zone: UTC+5:30 (IST)
- Postal code: 144507

Hakimpur is a village ("Pind" in Punjabi) 22 km from the city of Phagwara within the Doaba region of Punjab in India. This village is in the Shaheed Bhagat Singh Nagar district (Formerly Nawanshahr District), close to the boundary of Jalandhar district. The closest towns are Mukandpur, and Apra. The City of Banga, India is about 10 km from the village. The Brahmin clan of Korpals (sometimes Corpal), Jatt clan of Purewal and Sanger clan of Kumhar (sometimes written as "Ghumar") reside in this village. A large Gurudwara (Sikh Temple) is present as you enter Hakimpur, with a Mandir (Hindu Temple) also present in the village.
