= Daulat Khan Lodi =

Lodi governor of Lahore from 1500 to 1524

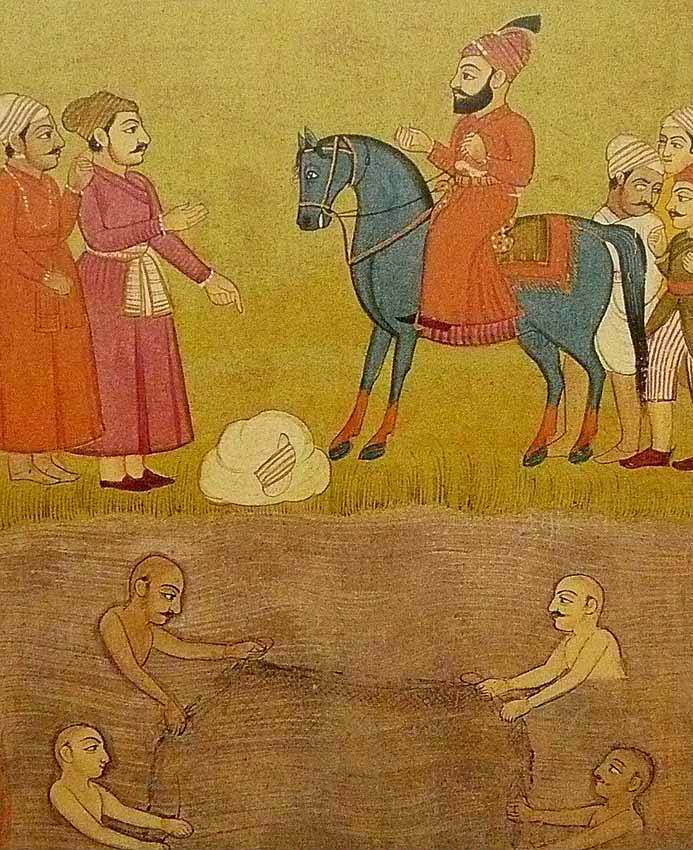
- Early 19th century Sikh depiction of Daulat Khan Lodi on horseback searching for Nanak in the Kali Bein (the name of the river is 'Vahi Nadi' in some accounts), whom is believed to have drowned

Governor of Lahore
- In office 1500–1524
- Monarch: Sikandar II; Ibrahim Lodi
- Preceded by: Sai'd Khan Sarwani
- Succeeded by: Kamran Mirza

Personal details
- Died: 1524
- Children: Dilawar khan,Ghazi khan
- Parent: Tatar Khan Lodi

Daulat Khan Lodi (Persian: دولت خان لودی) was the governor of Lahore during the reign of Sikandar Khan and Ibrahim Lodi, the last rulers of the Lodi dynasty. Due to disaffection with Ibrahim, Daulat invited Babur to invade the empire. He was initially governor of the Jalandhar Doab before being promoted to the governorship of Lahore between 1500 and 1504, and remained so until Babur's invasion in 1524. He was the son of Tatar Khan, the previous Nizam of Lahore, who had asserted his independence from Lodi dynasty under Bahlul Khan Lodi, father of Sikandar Khan Lodi. Daulat Khan was loyal to the dynasty but betrayed Ibrahim Lodhi due to his rigid, proud and suspicious nature.

== Aid of Babur ==
In 1523, Ibrahim Lodi, Daulat Khan's sovereign, was locked in a power struggle with his relatives and ministers. Daulat Khan was one of Ibrahim's chief opponents, along with the ruler's own uncle, Alam Khan (also known as Ala-ud-din), who at that time was living under the protection of Sultan Muzaffar II of Gujarat. There was rebellion throughout the empire. Aware of his own precarious position, Daulat Khan sent his son, Ghazi Khan Lodi, to Delhi to learn more about the state of affairs in the government. On his return, Ghazi Khan warned his father that Ibrahim Lodi was planning to remove his governorship. In response, Daulat Khan sent messengers to Babur in Kabul, offering his allegiance in exchange for assistance against the emperor. Babur agreed.

Babur's army quickly captured Lahore and Dipalpur. Daulat Khan and his sons, Ghazi and Dilawar Khan Lodi, joined Babur at Dipalpur only to be disappointed when Babur presented Daulat with Jalandhar and Sultanpur instead of Lahore. Rather than accepting these assignments, Daulat Khan and Ghazi went into hiding while Dilawar Khan betrayed his father and accepted Sultanpur and the title of Khan Khanan.

== Fate ==
Daulat Khan eventually emerged a short while later, when Babur left India to fight the Uzbeks at Balkh while leaving some forces in Lahore to assist Alam Khan in laying siege to Delhi. Daulat offered his assistance to Alam Khan, hoping to recover Lahore. However, since he was no longer on friendly terms with Babur, Daulat Khan's assistance was declined. Instead, he was left in charge of Punjab with his son Ghazi, while his other sons, Dilawar and Hajji, went to Delhi with Alam Khan. This attack was unsuccessful due to treachery on both sides.

Babur heard of Alam Khan's failure in Sialkot, on his way back to India. Meanwhile, Daulat Khan and Ghazi, hearing of Babur's return, fled to the fortress of Milwat, to the north of Lahore. Babur laid siege to Milwat and Daulat Khan surrendered. He died on the way to Bhera, where he was to have been imprisoned.

The events that Daulat Khan had started in motion by inviting Babur to India finally culminated in the battle of Panipat in 1526, where Ibrahim Khan Lodi lost his life. Babur was now ruler of India, going on to found the Mughal Empire.

== Significance in Sikhism ==
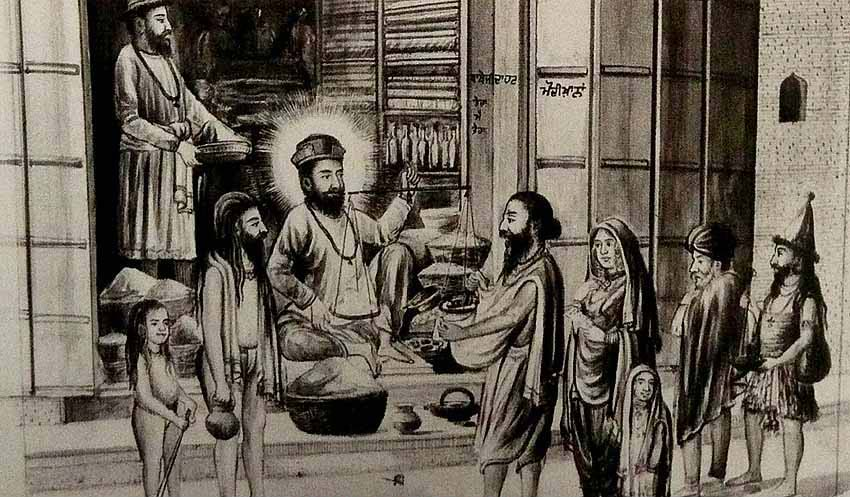
Guru Nanak in service at Daulat Khan Lodhi's stores, by Lahora Singh Mussawar, c. 1900.

One of his officials, Jai Ram, was married to Guru Nanak's sister, Nanaki. Jai Ram found Guru Nanak employment at Daulat Khan Lodi's store and granaries as a keeper. Complaints were often made against Nanak wasting the stocks to Daulat Khan but two audits found the store fully stocked with correct accounts. They also complained about Guru Nanak's teachings to the Nawab, at one point a Qazi called upon Nanak to report to court based on these accusations where Daulat Khan defended Nanak.

== See also ==
- Baolis of Mehrauli

== Sources ==
- Haig, Wolseley, ed. (1928). The Cambridge History of India. Vol. 3: Turks and Afghans. Cambridge: Cambridge University Press.
