= Mata Tripta =

Mother of Guru Nanak (1446–1522)

Mata Tripta Ji
- (ਮਾਤਾ) ਤ੍ਰਿਪਤਾ
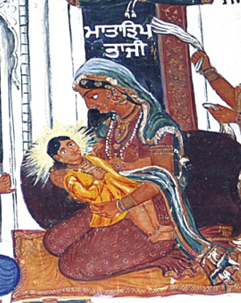
- Mural art depiction of Mata Tripta holding a newborn Nanak
- Born: Tripta Devi; December 1446
- Died: December 1522 (Aged 76)
- Spouse: Mehta Kalu
- Children: Guru Nanak (son); Bebe Nanaki (daughter)
- Parents: Ram Shri (father); Mata Bhirai (mother)
- Relatives: Baba Krishan (brother)

Mata Tripta (1446–1522; Punjabi: ਮਾਤਾ ਤ੍ਰਿਪਤਾ; mātā tripatā) was the mother of Guru Nanak, the founder of Sikhism.

== Biography ==
=== Early life ===
Tripta was born in 1446 to a father named Bhai Raam, a Jhangar Khatri from the village of Chaliawala (or Chahal), near Lahore, and her mother was Bhirai. (Note: Her father's name is alternatively spelt as 'Bhai Rama'. Her mother's name is alternatively spelt as 'Mai Bharai'.) She was born in a Hindu family. She had a brother named Krishan. (Note: Her brother's name is alternatively spelt as 'Krishna'.) She is said to have possessed a kind-hearted and soft-spoken disposition. She is further described as being a "simple, humble, kind and humane lady".

=== Marriage ===
In 1460, Tripta was wedded to Mehta Kalu. She gave birth to her first child, a daughter named Nanaki in 1464. Due to the birth of a girl child as the first-born and the resultant disappointment of her husband, Tripta started becoming more fervently religious in-order to please the deities in hopes for a son. Tripta gave birth to Nanak on 23 November 1469, in the village of Rai Bhoi Di Talwandi, some thirty five miles west of Lahore in the Sheikhupura district of Punjab, Delhi Sultanate (modern day Punjab, Pakistan). The name of the town was changed to Nankana Sahib in honour of the Guru.

=== Death ===
Tripta died in Kartarpur at the age of 76 shortly after the death of her husband Kalu.
