= Mehta Kalu =

Father of the first Sikh guru (1440–1522)

- ਮਹਿਤਾ ਕਾਲੂ ਕਲਿਆਣ ਚੰਦ ਦਾਸ ਬੇਦੀ
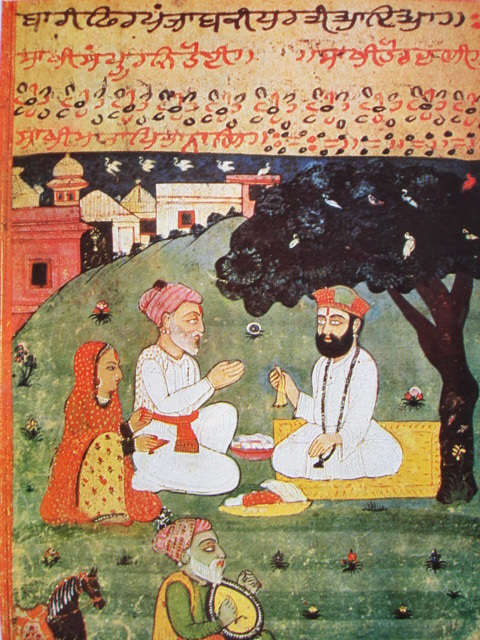
- Guru Nanak visiting his parents, Mehta Kalu and Mata Tripta, after returning home from an Udasi (travels). Mardana's in the foreground playing the rabab.
- Born: Kalyan Chand Das Bedi; 4 May 1440; Dehra Sahib Lohar, Tarn Taran, Punjab
- Died: 24 December 1522 (Aged 82); Kartarpur Sahib or Talwandi, Lodi Empire (Present day Pakistan)
- Spouse: Mata Tripta
- Children: Guru Nanak; Bebe Nanaki
- Parents: Shiv Ram Bedi (father); Mata Banarasi (mother)
- Relatives: Lal Chand (brother)

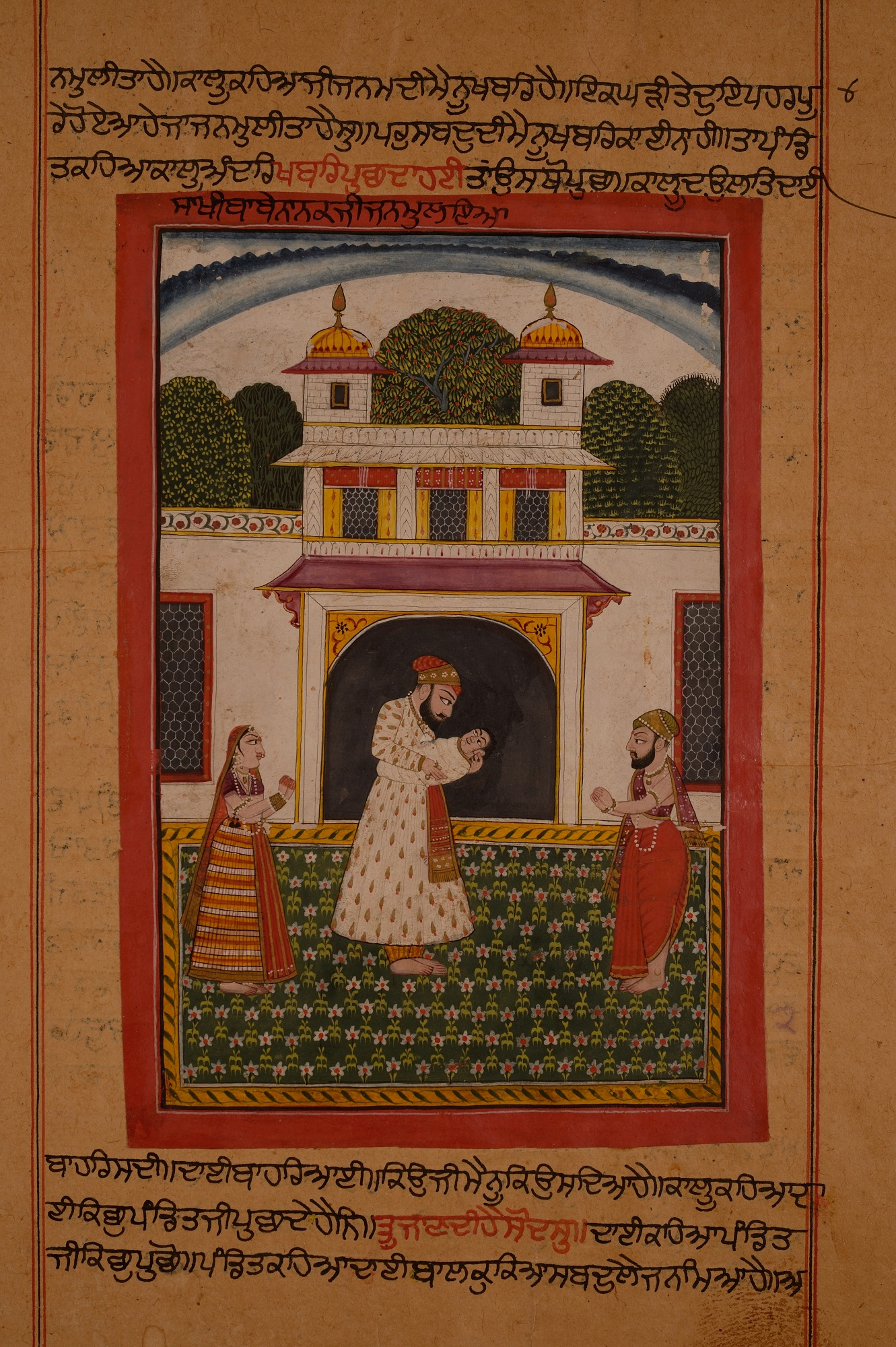
Janamsakhi painting Mehta Kalu holding baby Nanak.

Mehta Kalu, formally Kalyan Das, (1440–1522) was the father of Guru Nanak, the founder of Sikhism.

== Names ==
Various names are used to refer to Guru Nanak's father, some of which are: 'Mehta Kalu', 'Kalu Rai', 'Kalu Chand', 'Kalian Rai', and 'Kalian Chand'.

== Biography ==
=== Early life ===
Kalu was born in 1440 as 'Kalyan Das' to Shiv Ram Bedi (b. 1418) and Mata Banarasi in a Hindu Khatri family of the Bedi gotra. Kalu's paternal grandfather was Ram Narayan Bedi. (Note: Mehta Kalu's grandfather's name is alternatively spelt as 'Ram Narain'.) Mehta Kalu was born in the village of Patthe Vind (now extinct, was formerly located at the present-day site of Gurdwara Dera Sahib, approximately six miles east of Naushahra Pannuan).

Mehta Kalu's family later moved to the village of Rai-Bhoi-Di-Talwandi (now Nankana Sahib) where Shiv Ram Bedi found employment as the village patwari (revenue official). Kalu was the eldest of two sons, his younger brother was named Baba Lalu (1444–1542). Lalu was born in Talwandi rather than in Patthe Vind. Kalu would take over the role of village patwari from his father after his father died.

Thus, he served as the patwari (accountant) of crop revenue for the village of Talwandi in the employment of the zamindar (landlord), Rai Bular Bhatti.

=== Marriage ===
He married a girl named Tripta in 1460. Two offspring were born from the couple, a daughter named Nanaki and a son named Nanak.

=== Death ===
Kalu died at the age of 82 at Kartarpur, a locality that had been established by his son.
