= Bebe Nanaki =

Elder sister of Guru Nanak (c. 1464–1518)

- ਬੇਬੇ ਨਾਨਕੀ
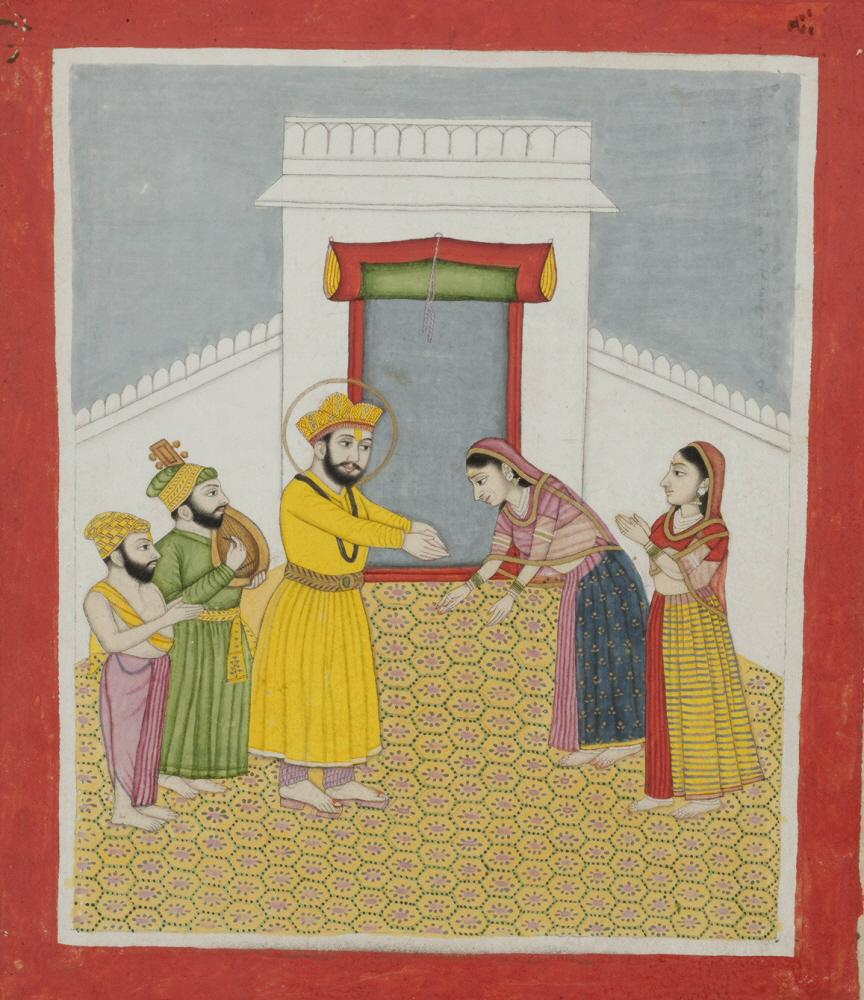
- Guru Nanak visits his sister Nanaki, from a manuscript ‘Janam Sakhi’ c.1800–1900
- Born: Nanaki Bedi c. 1464; Chahal, Delhi Sultanate (present-day Kasur District, Pakistan)
- Died: c. 1518 (aged 54)
- Spouse: Jai Ram Palta
- Children: none
- Parents: Mehta Kalu (father); Mata Tripta (mother)
- Relatives: Guru Nanak (brother)

Bebe Nanaki (Punjabi: ਬੇਬੇ ਨਾਨਕੀ, lit. 'Sister Nanaki'; c. 1464–1518), alternative spelt as Bibi Nanaki, was the elder sister of Guru Nanak, the founder and first Guru of Sikhism. Nanaki is an important figure in Sikhism, and is known as the first Gursikh. She was the first to realize her brother's 'philosophical inclination', and is credited for inspiring his use of music as an instrument of devotion to God.

== Biography ==
=== Early life ===
Nanaki and her brother were the children of Mehta Kalu and Tripta. She was born in 1464 in the city of Chahal, present-day Pakistan, she was named by her grandparents, who named her Nanaki after the word Nanakian, roughly meaning "the home of your maternal grandparents".

Bebe and Ji are added to her name as a sign of respect. Bebe is used to pay regard to an older woman and Ji given to anyone whom you want to show your respects regardless of age.

=== Marriage ===
Nanaki got married at an early age of 11. In those days it was customary to be married at such a young age.

In 1475 Nanaki married Jai Ram, a Palta Khatri employed at a modikhana, a storehouse for revenues collected in non-cash form, in the service of the Delhi Sultanate's Lahore governor Daulat Khan. (Note: Other sources describe Jai Ram as belonging to an Uppal Khatri background.) Jai Ram's father, Parmanand, had been the patwari at Sultanpur Lodhi. Jai Ram's father had died when he was young, so he took over his father's responsibilities as patwari. Jai Ram helped Nanak get a job at this modikhana in Sultanpur. Nanaki and Jai Ram would produce no biological children of their own.

=== Brother and sister ===
Nanaki had an immense adoration for her brother and was the first to recognize his "enlightened soul". She was five years older but played the role of a mother to him. She not only protected him from their father but she loved him unconditionally. Nanak was sent to live with Nanaki when he was only 15 years old. To instill his independence, she searched for a wife for him. Nanaki along with her husband found a woman, Sulakhni Chona, for Nanak to marry. Since Nanaki had no children of her own she loved and helped raise her brother's children, Sri Chand and Lakhmi Das.

Nanaki is known as being Guru Nanak’s first follower. She was eternally devoted to him and his cause. She is also known for inspiring Nanak in using music as an instrument of devotion to God. Knowing he had musical talent she bought him a Rebab to help him further his music.

Nanaki is said to have been very fond of Nanak and Sulakhni's two sons, Sri Chand and Lakhmi Das.

=== Death ===
The original house of Bebe Nanaki before it was destroyed by "Kar Seva" renovations in the 21st century and replaced with a modern building.

Bebe Nanaki died in 1518 at Sultanpur. As one of her last wishes she willed her brother, Guru Nanak, to be by her side during her last days. Her last breaths were enlightened with the Japji Sahib which was recited to her. Three days after her death, her spouse, Jai Ram, also died. Their funeral rites were carried out by Nanak.

== See also ==
- Gurdwara Janamasthan Bebe Nanaki

== Bibliography ==
- Singha, H. S. (2000). "Nanaki, Bebe". The Encyclopedia of Sikhism. Hemkunt Press. ISBN 9788170103011.
- Khalsa, Sukhmandir. "Bibi Nanaki (1464 – 1518)". About.com. Archived from the original on 21 October 2016.
