= Chahal, Kasur =

Place in Punjab, Pakistan

Chahal
- Location within Pakistan
- Coordinates: 30.46°N 74.10°E
- Country: Pakistan
- Province: Punjab
- Elevation: 179 m (587 ft)
- Time zone: UTC+5 (PST)

Chahal is a village in the Punjab province of Pakistan. It is located at 30°46'20N 74°10'20E with an altitude of 179 metres (590 feet).
